= Lekapenos =

Byzantine-Armenian noble family

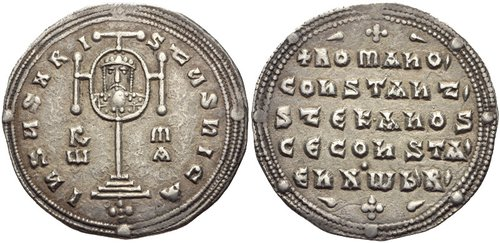
Miliaresion from 931–944, showing Romanos I's bust on a cross on the obverse and listing the names of Romanos and his co-emperors, Constantine VII, Stephen Lekapenos and Constantine Lekapenos on the reverse

Lekapenos (Greek: Λεκαπηνός) or Lakapenos (Greek: Λακαπηνός), usually Latinized as Lecapenus or Lacapenus, feminine form Lekapene (Greek: Λεκαπηνή) or Lakapene (Greek: Λακαπηνή), Latinized as Lecapene or Lacapene, was the name of a prominent, assumed, Byzantine-Armenian family of humble background which intermarried with and almost managed to usurp the throne from the Macedonian dynasty in the first half of the 10th century.

== History ==
The family was founded by Theophylact, surnamed Abaktistos or Abastaktos (the Unbearable), who had rescued the Emperor Basil I from the enemy in battle at Tephrike in 872, saving his life, and had been rewarded by a place in the Imperial Guard and received estates as a reward. The family surname derives from the locality of Lakape; possibly these estates were located there. Theophylact's son Romanos became commander-in-chief of the Imperial Fleet and eventually senior emperor in 920 after marrying his daughter Helena to the legitimate emperor Constantine VII, grandson of Basil I. He raised three of his sons, Christopher, Stephen, and Constantine, as co-emperors alongside Constantine VII. Another son, Theophylact, was made Patriarch of Constantinople, and Christopher's daughter Maria-Irene was married to the Tsar Peter I of Bulgaria. Romanos was deposed by Stephen and Constantine in December 944, but they too were in turn soon deposed and Constantine VII was restored as sole emperor. Their descendants continued to occupy senior palace offices in the next decades, but the most notable member of the family was Romanos' illegitimate son Basil Lekapenos, who as the imperial parakoimomenos was the virtual ruler of the empire until the 980s.

The family is barely attested thereafter; only a certain Constantine Lekapenos is known through his seal for the entirety of the 11th century, and the last important member was George Lakapenos, a 14th-century official and writer.

== List of rulers ==
- Romanos I Lekapenos (Ρωμανός A') (870–948, ruled 919–944) – father-in-law of Constantine VII; co-emperor, attempted to found his own dynasty. Deposed by his sons and entered monastery.
  - Christopher Lekapenos (ruled 921–931) – son of Romanos I; co-emperor
    - Romanos (died before 927), son and brief co-emperor of Christopher
  - Stephen Lekapenos (ruled 924–945) – son of Romanos I; co-emperor
  - Constantine Lekapenos (ruled 924–945) – son of Romanos I; co-emperor

=== Matrilineal descent ===
- Romanos II the Purple-born (Ρωμανός Β') (938–963, ruled 959–963) – son of Constantine VII and Helena Lekapene
- Basil II (Βασίλειος Β') the Bulgar-slayer (958–1025, ruled 976–1025) – son of Romanos II
- Constantine VIII (Κωνσταντῖνος Η') (960-1028, ruled 1025–1028) – son of Romanos II; silent co-emperor with Basil II, sole emperor after his brother's death
  - Zoë Porphyrogenita (Ζωή) (c. 978–1050, ruled 1028–1050) – daughter of Constantine VIII
  - Theodora Porphyrogenita (Θεοδώρα) (980–1056, ruled 1042) – daughter of Constantine VIII, co-empress with Zoe

== Family tree ==
After Steven Runciman, The Emperor Romanus Lecapenus and His Reign: A Study of Tenth-Century Byzantium, Appendix IV:

Theophylact Abaktistos
Romanos I Lekapenos (870–948), senior emperor 920–944	Theodora (died 922), Augusta
Christopher Lekapenos (died 931), junior co-emperor 921–931	Sophia, daughter of Niketas	Stephen Lekapenos (910–963), junior co-emperor 924–945	Anna Gabalaina, Augusta	N. Lekapene	Romanos Saronites	Theophylact Lekapenos (917–956), Patriarch of Constantinople 933–956
Helena Lekapene (died 961), Augusta	Constantine VII (905–959), sole emperor 913–920 & 944–959, junior co-emperor 920–944	Agathe Lekapene	Romanos Argyros	Helena, daughter of Adrian	Constantine Lekapenos (912–946), junior co-emperor 924–945	Theophano Mamas	N. Lekapene	Mousele
Peter I, Tsar of Bulgaria 927–969	Maria-Irene Lekapene (died ca. 966)	Romanos Lekapenos	Michael Lekapenos, magistros and rhaiktor	Romanos Lekapenos, sebastophoros	Romanos Lekapenos, patrikios and eparchos

== See also ==
- History of the Byzantine Empire
- Byzantine Empire under the Macedonian dynasty

== Sources ==
- Kazhdan, Alexander (1991). "Lekapenos". In Kazhdan, Alexander (ed.). The Oxford Dictionary of Byzantium. New York and Oxford: Oxford University Press. pp. 1203–1204. ISBN 978-0-19-504652-6.
- Runciman, Steven (1988) [1929]. The Emperor Romanus Lecapenus and His Reign: A Study of Tenth-Century Byzantium. Cambridge, United Kingdom: Cambridge University Press. ISBN 0-521-35722-5.
