= Rus'-Byzantine War of 970–971 =

War of 970–971

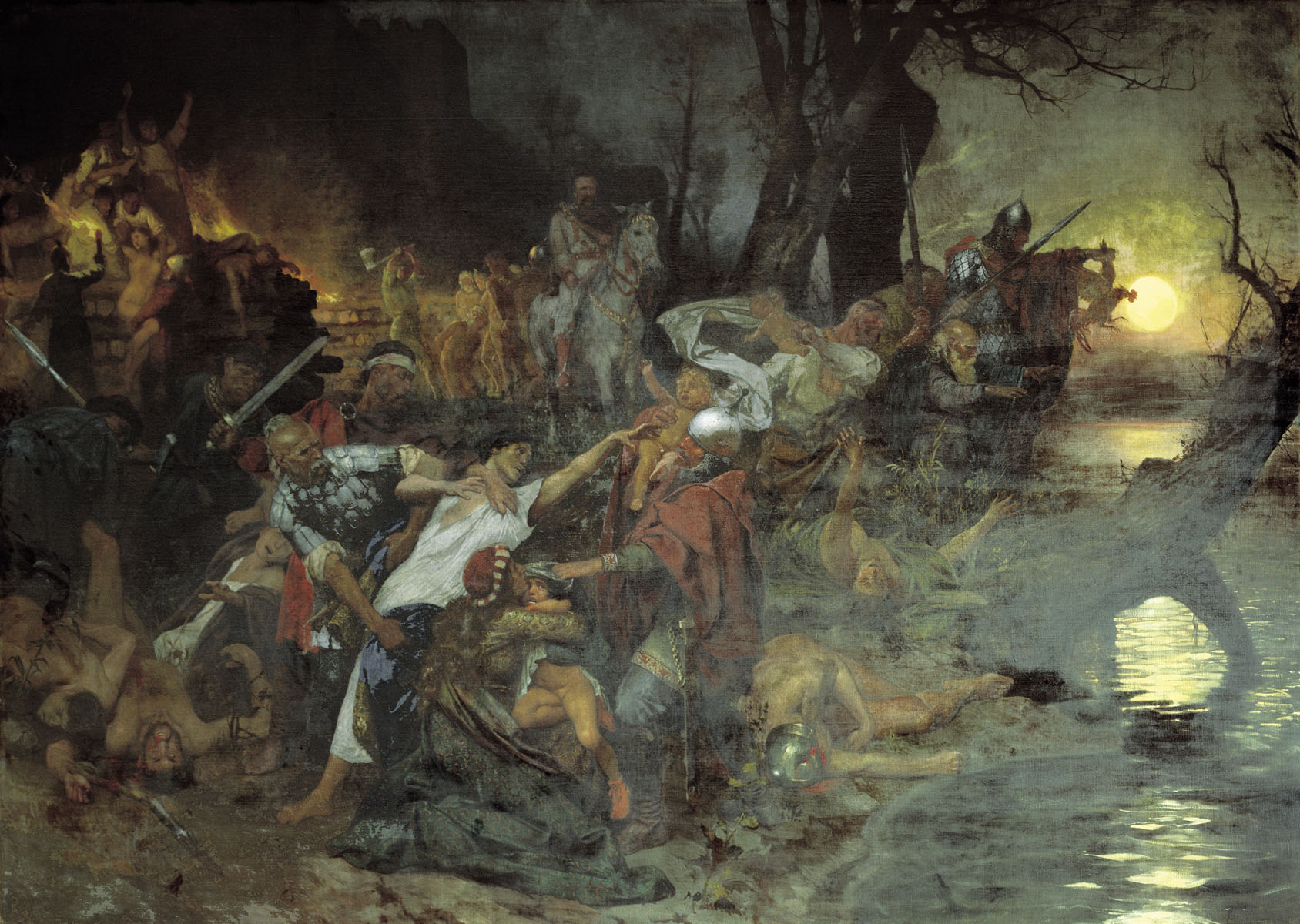
- Svyatoslav's Warriors in the Battle of Silistria
Date	967-971
Location	Thrace and Moesia
Result	Byzantines victory over the Rus'.

Belligerents
Kievan	Bulgaria	Byzantine Empire
- Pechenegs

From 970 to 971, a war between three belligerents occurred in Moesia and Thrace. Commonly referred to as the Rus'-Byzantine War of 970–971 or Rus'-Byzantine War, it resulted in a complete win for the Byzantines, and the start of another fifty-year war that led to the fall of Bulgaria in 1018.The Byzantines instigated the Rus' ruler, Svetoslaus, to attack Bulgaria, which led to the collapse of the Bulgarian state and the occupation of most of the territory by the Rus'. Soon after the victory, the Russians themselves were defeated by the Byzantines and had to withdraw, leaving Bulgaria free to be incorporated into the Byzantine Empire.

In 927, a peace treaty was signed between Bulgaria and Byzantium, beginning a period of forty years of peace after many years of war. Both states prospered in this interlude, but the balance of power gradually tipped in favor of the Byzantines, who advanced territorially against the Abbasid Caliphate in the east and managed to establish a set of alliances that effectively trapped Bulgaria. In 965–66, the belligerent emperor Nikephoros II Phokas (r. 963–969) refused to renew the annual tribute that was part of the peace treaty and declared war on Bulgaria. Concerned about his campaigns in the East, however, Nikephoros resolved this war through an intermediary, inviting Svetoslav to invade his enemy.

Svetoslav's subsequent campaign far exceeded the expectations of the Byzantines, who hoped the alliance would be merely a means to pressure the Bulgarians. The Rus prince conquered the central regions of the Bulgarian Empire in 967–969, imprisoned Tsar Boris II, and through him, ruled the country. Svetoslav intended to continue the advance southward by attacking the Byzantine Empire as well, which in turn considered the founding of a new and powerful Rus'-Bulgarian state in the Balkans a threat. After stopping the Rus' advance through Thrace at the Battle of Arcadiopolis in 970, Emperor John I Tzimiskes led an army north the following year and captured Preslava, the Bulgarian capital. After a three-month siege of the Fortress of Dorostolo, Svetoslav agreed to the Byzantine terms and withdrew from Bulgaria. Tzimiskes formally annexed eastern Bulgaria to the Byzantine Empire, but control of the central and western regions of the country effectively remained outside Byzantine hands; This fact would lead to the revival of the Bulgarian state in this region under the Cometopulian dynasty.

== Background ==
At the beginning of the 10th Century, two powers had dominated the Balkans: the Byzantine Empire, which controlled the south of the peninsula and the coastal regions, and the Bulgarian Empire, in the central and northern regions. The first decades of the century were dominated by Simeon I (r. 893–927) who, through a series of wars, expanded his empire at the expense of the Byzantines and secured for himself the title of "emperor." Simeon's death in May 927 was immediately followed by an accommodation between the two powers, formalized in a treaty and a marriage alliance. Simeon's second son and successor, Peter I (r. 927–969) married Irene Lekapena (called Maria), the granddaughter of Emperor Romanos I Lekapenos and his imperial title was also recognized. An annual tribute (which the Byzantines, to keep up appearances, called the "subsidy to support Mary") would then be paid to the Bulgarian emperor in exchange for peace.
