= Constantine Lekapenos =

Byzantine emperor from 924 to 945

- Emperor and Autocrat of the Romans
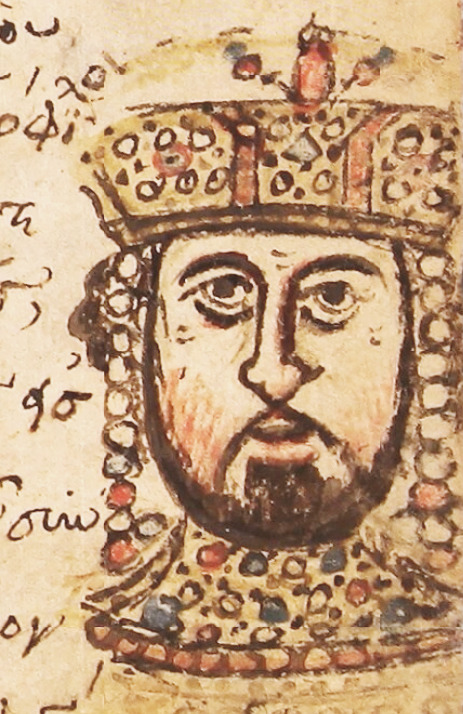
- 15th-century portrait of Constantine, from the Mutinensis gr. 122 manuscript

Byzantine emperor
- Reign: 25 December 924 – 27 January 945
- Co-emperors: Constantine VII (920–944); Romanos I (920–944); Christopher (921–931); Stephen (924–944)
- Died: 946–948
- Spouse: Helen; Theophano Mamas
- Issue: Romanos Lekapenos
- Dynasty: Lekapenos
- Father: Romanos I Lekapenos
- Mother: Theodora

Constantine Lekapenos or Lecapenus (Ancient Greek: Κωνσταντῖνος Λακαπηνός or Λεκαπηνός, romanized: Kōnstantīnos Lakapēnos or Lekapēnos) was the third son of the Byzantine emperor Romanos I Lekapenos (r. 920–944), and co-emperor from 924 to 945. With his elder brother Stephen, he deposed Romanos I in December 944, but was overthrown and exiled by the co-emperor Constantine VII (r. 913–959) a few weeks later. Constantine Lekapenos was exiled to the island of Samothrace, where he was killed while attempting to escape sometime between 946 and 948.

== Biography ==
=== Family ===
Constantine was one of the youngest sons of Romanos I and his wife Theodora. The chronicler Theophanes Continuatus mentions him as the youngest son of the imperial couple, while the 11th-century chronicler George Kedrenos mentions as the third of four known sons. His older brothers were Christopher Lekapenos (co-emperor 921–931) and Stephen Lekapenos (co-emperor 924–945). It is unclear if his brother Theophylact (Patriarch of Constantinople in 933–956) was younger or slightly older than Constantine. His sisters included Helena, who married Constantine VII Porphyrogennetos (r. 913–959), and Agatha, who married Romanos Argyros. He probably also had at least two unnamed sisters, known only because of their marriages to the magistroi Romanos Mosele and Romanos Saronites.

=== Reign ===
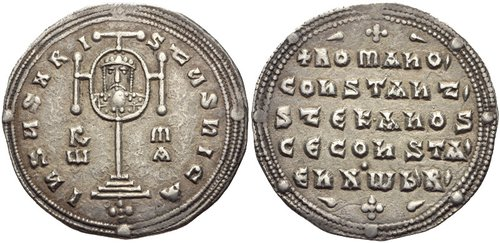
Silver miliaresion from 931–944, showing Romanos I's bust on a cross on the obverse and listing the names of Romanos and his co-emperors, Constantine VII, Stephen Lekapenos and Constantine Lekapenos, on the reverse.

Romanos Lekapenos had risen to power in 919, when he had managed to appoint himself regent over the young Constantine VII and marry his daughter Helena to him. Within a year, he successively rose from basileopator to Caesar, and was eventually crowned senior emperor on 17 December 920. To consolidate his hold on power, and with a view of supplanting the ruling Macedonian dynasty with his own family, he raised his eldest son Christopher to co-emperor in May 921, while Stephen and Constantine were proclaimed co-emperors on 25 December 924.

Following Christopher's early death in 931, and given Constantine VII's de facto sidelining, Stephen and Constantine assumed an increased prominence, although formally they still ranked after their brother-in-law in the college of emperors. In 939, Constantine married his first wife Helena, a daughter of the patrikios Adrian, an Armenian.

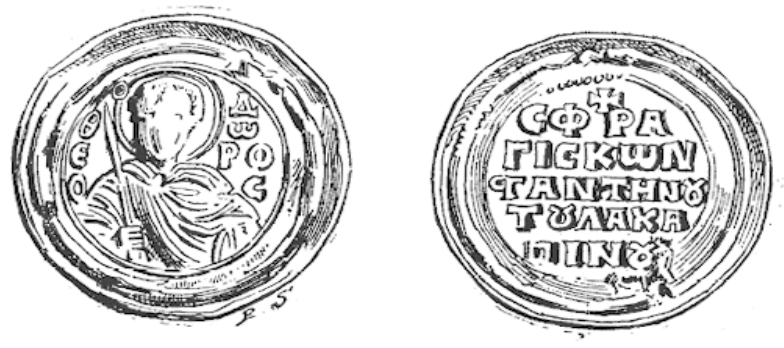
Seal of Constantine Lekapenos

The historian Symeon Magister records the death of Helena on 14 January 940, and on 2 February of the same year, Constantine married his second wife, Theophano Mamas. Constantine had a son, named Romanos, but it is not recorded by which of his two wives. This Romanos was castrated in 945, after the Lekapenoi lost power, to prevent him from claiming the Byzantine throne. He nevertheless pursued a career in the court, eventually reaching the rank of patrikios and the post of Eparch of Constantinople.

Stephen and Constantine Lekapenos came to the fore in 943, when they opposed a dynastic marriage for their nephew, Romanos II. Their father wanted to have his eldest surviving grandson married to Euphrosyne, a daughter of his successful general John Kourkouas. Although such a union would effectively cement the loyalty of the army, it would also strengthen the position of the legitimate Macedonian line, represented by Romanos II and his father Constantine VII, over the imperial claims of Romanos's own sons. Predictably, Stephen and Constantine opposed this decision, and prevailed upon their father, who was by this time ill and old, to dismiss Kourkouas in the autumn of 944. Romanos II instead married Bertha, an illegitimate daughter of Hugh of Arles, King of Italy, who changed her name to Eudokia after her marriage.

With Romanos I approaching the end of his life, the matter of his succession became urgent. In 943, Romanos drafted a will which would leave Constantine VII as the senior emperor following his death. This greatly upset his two sons, who feared that their brother-in-law would have them deposed and force them to take monastic vows. Motivated, in the opinion of Steven Runciman, partially by self-preservation and partially by genuine ambition, they started planning to seize power through a coup d'état, with Stephen apparently the ringleader and Constantine a rather reluctant partner.

Their fellow conspirators included Marianos Argyros, the protospatharios Basil Peteinos, Manuel Kourtikes, the strategos Diogenes, and a certain Clado and Philip. Kedrenos, however, considers Peteinos to have served as an agent of Constantine VII among the conspirators. On 16 or 20 December 944, the conspirators set their plans in motion. The two brothers smuggled their supporters into the Great Palace of Constantinople during the midday break in palace activities. They then led their men into the chamber of Romanos I, where they easily captured the "ill old man". They were able to transport him to the nearest harbour and from there to Prote, one of the Princes' Islands and a popular place of exile. There, Romanos agreed to take monastic vows and retire from the throne.

Having managed to quietly depose their father, the brothers now had to deal with Constantine VII. Unfortunately for them, rumours soon spread around Constantinople to the effect that, following Romanos's deposition, Constantine VII's life was in danger. Before long, crowds gathered before the palace, demanding to see their emperor in person. The contemporary Lombard historian Liutprand of Cremona notes that the ambassadors and envoys from Amalfi, Gaeta, Rome, and Provence present in the capital also supported Constantine VII. Stephen and his brother had to submit to the inevitable, recognizing their brother-in-law as the senior emperor.

The new triumvirate lasted for about 40 days. The three emperors soon appointed new leaders for the military services. Bardas Phokas the Elder was appointed as the new Domestic of the Schools, and Constantine Gongyles as head of the Byzantine navy. Stephen and his brother managed to reward their fellow conspirators. Peteinos became patrikios and Great Hetaeriarch, Argyros was appointed Count of the Stable, Kourtikes a patrikios and droungarios of the Watch.

On 27 January 945, however, at the urging of their sister, the Augusta Helena, another coup removed the two Lekapenoi from power under the accusation that they attempted to poison Constantine VII, and restored the sole imperial authority to the latter.

=== Exile and death ===
Initially, the two brothers were sent to Prote. The Byzantine chroniclers have their father welcoming them by quoting a passage from the Book of Isaiah, specifically Chapter 1.2: "Hear, O heavens, and give ear, O earth; for Jehovah hath spoken: I have nourished and brought up children, and they have rebelled against me." Liutprand of Cremona, however, gives a slightly different account, having Romanos I receive his sons with bitter sarcasm, thanking them for not neglecting him and begging them to excuse the monks for their ignorance on how to properly receive emperors.

Constantine was soon transported to Tenedos, and then to Samothrace. He was ultimately killed while attempting to escape the island. The exact date is unknown, but since Theophanes Continuatus claims that the exiled Romanos I had a nightmare featuring his son's descent to Hell at the time of Constantine's death, it can be placed between 946 and Romanos's own death in 948.

== Sources ==
- Charanis, Peter (1963). The Armenians in the Byzantine Empire. Lisbon: Fundação Calouste Gulbenkian Armenian Library. OCLC 17186882.
- Kazhdan, Alexander, ed. (1991). The Oxford Dictionary of Byzantium. Oxford and New York: Oxford University Press. ISBN 0-19-504652-8.
- Runciman, Steven (1988) [1929]. The Emperor Romanus Lecapenus and His Reign: A Study of Tenth-Century Byzantium. Cambridge: Cambridge University Press. ISBN 0-521-35722-5.
- Treadgold, Warren (1997). A History of the Byzantine State and Society. Stanford, California: Stanford University Press. ISBN 0-8047-2630-2.
- Lilie, Ralph-Johannes; Ludwig, Claudia; Pratsch, Thomas; Zielke, Beate (2013). Prosopographie der mittelbyzantinischen Zeit Online. Berlin-Brandenburgische Akademie der Wissenschaften. Nach Vorarbeiten F. Winkelmanns erstellt (in German). Berlin and Boston: De Gruyter.
