= Christopher Lekapenos =

Byzantine emperor from 921 to 931

- Emperor and Autocrat of the Romans
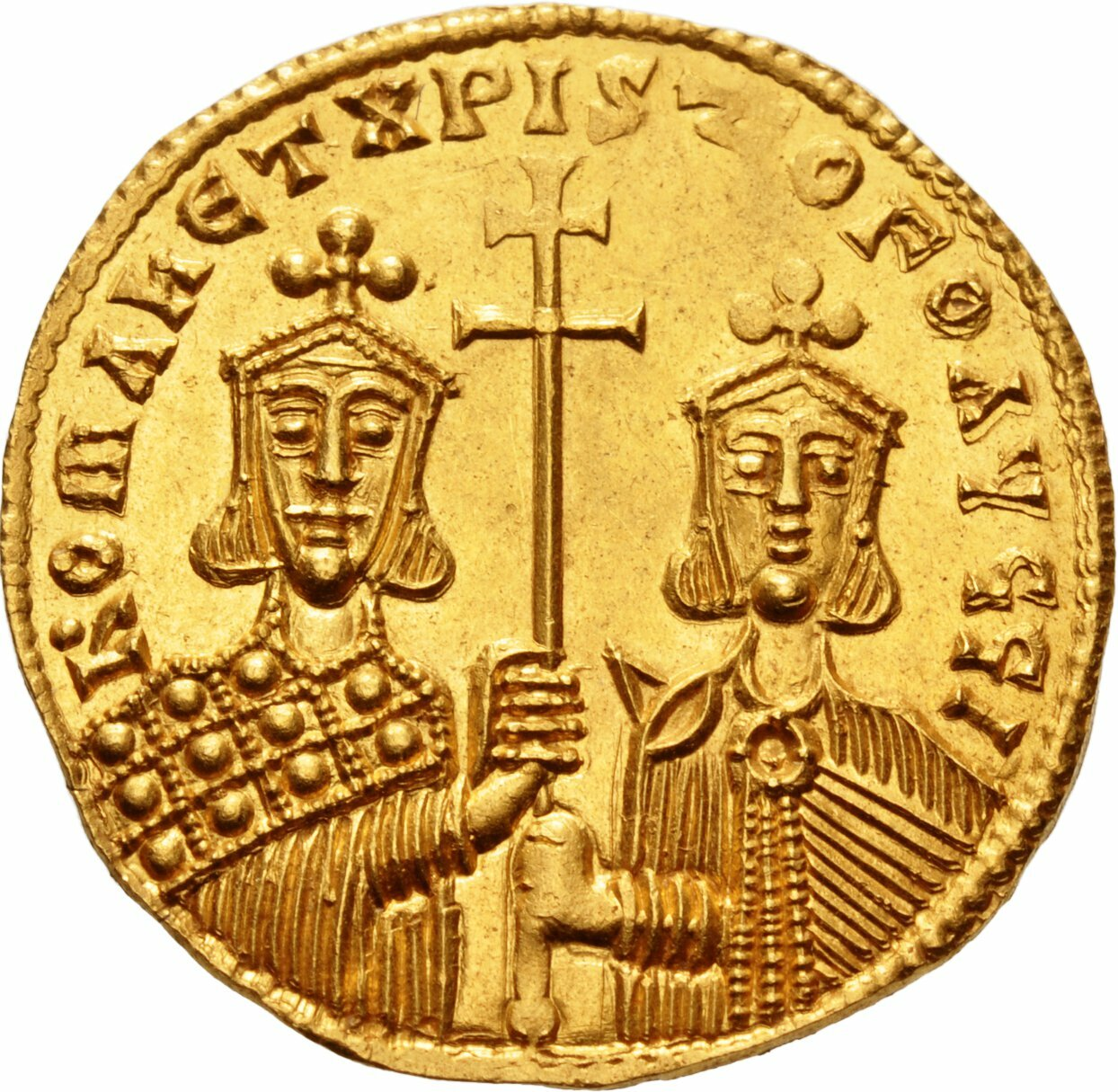
- Gold solidus of Romanos I Lekapenos (left) with his son Christopher (right)

Byzantine co-emperor
- Reign: 20 May 921 – August 931
- Coronation: 20 May 921
- Predecessors: Constantine VII; Romanos I
- Successors: Romanos I Constantine VII; Constantine; Stephen
- Co-emperors: See list: Romanos I (921–931) Constantine VII (921–931) Constantine (924–931) Stephen (924–931)
- Died: August 931
- Spouse: Sophia
- Issue more...: Irene, Empress of Bulgaria
- Dynasty: Lekapenos
- Father: Romanos I Lekapenos
- Mother: Theodora

Christopher Lekapenos or Lecapenus (Greek: Χριστόφορος Λακαπηνός or Λεκαπηνός, romanized: Christóphoros Lakapēnos or Lekapēnos; died August 931) was the eldest son of Emperor Romanos I Lekapenos (r. 920–944) and co-emperor of the Byzantine Empire from 921 until his death in 931. Christopher was given the position of megas hetaireiarches (commander of the palace guard) in spring 919, after Romanos assumed guardianship of the underage Emperor Constantine VII. Romanos, who made himself co-emperor in 920, raised Christopher to co-emperor on 21 May 921 to give his family precedence over Constantine VII's Macedonian line. In 928 Christopher's father-in-law, Niketas, unsuccessfully attempted to incite Christopher to usurp his father, resulting in Niketas being banished. Christopher died in August 931, succeeded by his father and two brothers, Stephen Lekapenos and Constantine Lekapenos, and Constantine VII. In December 944 his brothers overthrew and exiled their father, but they themselves were exiled in January 945 after attempting to oust Constantine VII.

== Early life ==
Christopher Lekapenos was the eldest son and the second-oldest child (after his sister Helena) of the Byzantine general Romanos Lekapenos and his wife Theodora. His younger siblings were Agatha, who married Byzantine aristocrat Romanos Argyros; Stephen and Constantine (co-emperors from 924 until 945); Theophylact (patriarch of Constantinople in 933–956); and two unnamed younger sisters. Christopher married Sophia, the daughter of Niketas, a wealthy Slav patrician from the Peloponnese, before Romanos became co-emperor in 920, but nothing else is known of Christopher's early life. He had a daughter of marriageable age in 927.

== Co-emperor ==
In spring 919, Romanos—who by this point had assumed control of Boukoleon Palace in Constantinople by military force—had his daughter Helena Lekapene married to the 13-year-old emperor Constantine VII Porphyrogennetos (who had been sole monarch since 913). Thereafter, he assumed the role of guardian of the Emperor. Christopher succeeded him in his post as megas hetaireiarches, commander of the palace guard. Romanos soon facilitated his own coronation by Patriarch Nicholas of Constantinople in December 920, and eventually advanced himself before the young Constantine in precedence. Romanos crowned his wife, Theodora, as augusta on 6 January 921. To further cement his position, and planning to advance his own family over the Macedonian line to which Constantine VII belonged, Romanos crowned Christopher as co-emperor on 20 May 921. When Christopher's mother, Theodora, died on 20 February 922, his wife Sophia was raised to the dignity of augusta alongside Helena Lekapene. Some solidi (gold coins used in Byzantine currency) dating from Christopher's time as emperor depict both him and Constantine Porphyrogennetos bearded, which the numismatist Philip Grierson explains as originating "...presumably from a wish to conciliate the formal precedence of Constantine [Porphyrogennetos] with Christopher's greater age and Romanus' desire to favor his own son." Other coins exclude Constantine altogether, instead showing only Romanos and Christopher; on these issues, Christopher appears beardless and shorter than his father.

In 924, Christopher's younger brothers Stephen and Constantine were crowned as co-emperors. The popular historian John Julius Norwich describes the two as immoral, corrupt, and "worthless". He states that Christopher, in comparison, "showed some degree of promise and might have proved worthy of his father had he lived to succeed him". On 8 October 927, as part of a peace agreement, Christopher's daughter Maria, renamed Irene (meaning "peace") for the occasion, was married to the Bulgarian emperor Peter I (r. 927–969). The marriage of a Byzantine princess to a foreign ruler was highly unusual at the time. On 10 October, the third day of the feast held in Pegae, Christopher was advanced before Constantine Porphyrogennetos. This was done at the insistence of the Bulgarians, and perhaps engineered by Romanos.

In 928, Christopher's father-in-law Niketas unsuccessfully tried to incite him to depose Romanos, but was banished. The motive behind the attempted coup was perhaps Christopher's poor health, and fears by his wife and her father that, should he die prematurely, they would lose their status. In 929, or later, Christopher served as a best man for the wedding of the Bulgarian prince Ivan, who had fled from Bulgaria to Constantinople after conspiring to seize the Bulgarian throne. Christopher died in August 931; several anacreontic poems by an anonymous writer were composed sometime between 931 and 944 in mourning of him. Christopher was buried Myrelaion, breaking from the longstanding tradition of interring emperors at the Church of the Holy Apostles. As Romanos' favourite son, he was much mourned by his father, who shed tears "more than the Egyptians" according to Theophanes Continuatus, and thereafter increasingly became devoted to religious pursuits. Soon after Christopher's death, Sophia too retired from the court and entered a monastery, where she died. Christopher's death resulted in the weakening of the alliance between the Byzantine and Bulgarian empires. Empress Irene of Bulgaria ceased making her frequent visits to her homeland in the years following her father's death, and only visited it once.

Christopher's death left his father and his two brothers, Stephen Lekapenos and Constantine Lekapenos; as well as Constantine VII as the remaining co-emperors. In December 944 Stephen and Constantine deposed their father, forcing him to live in a monastery on Prote in the Princes' Islands. However, when they attempted to depose Constantine VII also, the people of Constantinople revolted; after a tenuous triumvirate lasting roughly 40 days, they were themselves exiled in January 945 by order of Constantine VII.

== Family ==
Through his marriage to Sophia, Christopher had three children:

1. Maria-Irene, the empress-consort of Peter I of Bulgaria.
2. Romanos, who died in infancy. According to the chronicler Joannes Zonaras, he was favoured by his grandfather, who considered promoting the infant to his father's position as senior co-emperor, which ultimately failed due to his death shortly before his father's. Zonaras states that he was also crowned co-emperor, while Michael Psellos says he was only "regarded worthy of the empire" without mentioning any coronation. The Prosopography of the Byzantine World refers to him as a co-emperor, but most scholars do not.
3. Michael, an infant at the time of Christopher's death, was made a cleric at the time of the family's fall from power in 945. He eventually garnered several high-ranking positions at the Byzantine court, but nothing further is known of his later life.

== Sources ==
- Grierson, Philip; Bellinger, Alfred Raymond, eds. (1973). Catalogue of the Byzantine Coins in the Dumbarton Oaks Collection and in the Whittemore Collection, vol. 3: Leo III to Nicephorus III, 717–1081. Washington, D.C.: Harvard University Press. ISBN 978-0-88402-045-5.
- Høgel, Christian (2002). Symeon Metaphrastes: Rewriting and Canonization. Denmark: Museum Tusculanum Press. ISBN 9788772896755.
- Kazhdan, Alexander, ed. (1991). Oxford Dictionary of Byzantium. Oxford: Oxford University Press. ISBN 978-0-19-504652-6.
- Lilie, Ralph-Johannes; Ludwig, Claudia; Pratsch, Thomas; Zielke, Beate (1998–2013). Prosopographie der mittelbyzantinischen Zeit (in German). Berlin and Boston: De Gruyter.
- Norwich, John Julius (1992). Byzantium: The Apogee. New York: Alfred A. Knopf. ISBN 978-0-394-53779-5.
- Ostrogorsky, George (1957). History of the Byzantine State. New Brunswick, New Jersey: Rutgers University Press. SBN 8135-0599-2.
- Previté-Orton, Charles (1975). Cambridge Medieval History, Shorter: Volume 1, The Later Roman Empire to the Twelfth Century (1st ed.). Cambridge: Cambridge University Press. ISBN 0-521-09976-5.
- Runciman, Steven (1930). "Emperor of the Bulgars and the Romans". A History of the First Bulgarian Empire. London: George Bell & Sons. OCLC 832687.
- Runciman, Steven (1988) [1929]. The Emperor Romanus Lecapenus and His Reign: A Study of Tenth-Century Byzantium. Cambridge: Cambridge University Press. ISBN 978-0-521-35722-7.

Christopher Lekapenos Macedonian dynasty Born: c. 890–895 Died: August 931
Regnal titles
Preceded by Constantine VII; Romanos I Lekapenos	Byzantine emperor 921–931 with Constantine VII (921–931); Romanos I Lekapenos (921–931); Stephen Lekapenos (924–931); Constantine Lekapenos (924–931)	Succeeded by Constantine VII; Romanos I Lekapenos; Constantine Lekapenos; Stephen Lekapenos
