= Joseph Bringas =

Byzantine admiral

Joseph Bringas (Greek: Ὶωσῆφ Βρίγγας, romanized: Iosêph Bríggas) was an important Byzantine eunuch official in the reigns of Emperor Constantine VII (r. 945–959) and Emperor Romanos II (r. 959–963), serving as chief minister and effective regent during the latter. Having unsuccessfully opposed the rise of Nikephoros Phokas to the imperial throne in 963, he was exiled to a monastery, where he died in 965.

== Biography ==
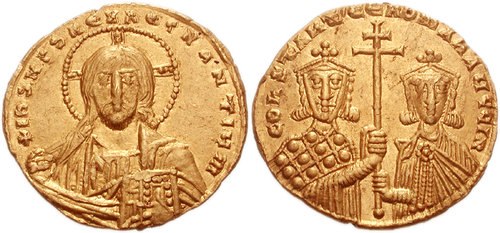
Gold solidus of Emperor Constantine VII (r. 945–959) with his son and heir, Romanos II.

Historian Leo the Deacon reported that Bringas hailed from Paphlagonia. He gradually rose in imperial service to the rank of patrikios and the court post of praipositos. Emperor Constantine VII appointed him first as sakellarios and then as Droungarios of the Imperial Fleet, the position he held at the time of the emperor's death.

When Emperor Constantine VII's son, Romanos, assumed the Byzantine throne, he appointed Bringas as his parakoimomenos (chamberlain). The young emperor preferred to spend his time hunting, and largely left affairs of state to him. In this capacity, Bringas foiled a plot against Romanos led by a group of nobles around the magistros Basil Peteinos. The plotters were arrested, tortured, and exiled, although most of them, with the exception of Peteinos, were soon recalled.

When Emperor Romanos II died suddenly on 15 March 963, leaving behind only his young sons Basil II and Constantine VIII (five and two or three years old respectively), he left Bringas as the de facto head of state, although by tradition, the Empress-dowager Theophano was the nominal regent. Theophano did not trust Bringas, however, and the powerful parakoimomenos had other enemies: his predecessor and rival, Basil Lekapenos, and the successful and widely popular general Nikephoros Phokas, who had just returned from his conquest of the Emirate of Crete and a highly successful raid into Cilicia and Syria, which led to the sack of the Hamdanid capital, Aleppo.

Phokas visited the capital and celebrated his scheduled triumph in April 963, but then accused Bringas of plotting against him, and sought refuge in Hagia Sophia. There, he gained the support of the Patriarch of Constantinople, Polyeuctus, and with his aid he secured a re-appointment as Domestic of the Schools (commander in chief) of the East, despite Bringas's objections. Bringas now turned to Marianos Argyros, the commander-in-chief of the West, and offered him the Byzantine throne. At the same time, he wrote to the strategos of the Anatolics John Tzimiskes, Phokas's nephew and most important general, offering his uncle's post if he would turn against him. Instead, Tzimiskes revealed the letter to Phokas and urged him to action. Phokas's troops proclaimed him emperor on 2 July 963 and set out for Constantinople. In the capital, Bringas brought in troops, seized all ships to prevent a crossing of the Bosporus by the rebels, and even took Nikephoros's father, the aged Bardas Phokas, as a hostage. The populace of the city, however, supported the rebellion, and as the rebel army approached, rose up against Bringas's troops, supported by the patriarch and Basil Lekapenos, who reportedly armed 3,000 of his retainers and sent them out to fight.

The street clashes lasted for three days, and in the end, Phokas's supporters prevailed. Bringas was forced to flee to Hagia Sophia seeking sanctuary, while Basil Lekapenos assumed the post of parakoimomenos and welcomed Nikephoros Phokas into the capital, where he was crowned on August 16. Bringas was banished first to his native Paphlagonia, and then to the monastery of Asekretis at Pythia near Nicomedia, where he died in 965.

== Sources ==
- Garland, Lynda (1999). Byzantine Empresses: Women and Power in Byzantium, AD 527–1204. New York and London: Routledge. ISBN 978-0-415-14688-3.
- Kazhdan, Alexander, ed. (1991). The Oxford Dictionary of Byzantium. Oxford and New York: Oxford University Press. ISBN 0-19-504652-8.
- Talbot, Alice-Mary; Sullivan, Dennis F., eds. (2005). The History of Leo the Deacon: Byzantine Military Expansion in the Tenth Century. Washington, DC: Dumbarton Oaks. ISBN 978-0-88402-324-1.
- Treadgold, Warren (1997). A History of the Byzantine State and Society. Stanford, California: Stanford University Press. ISBN 0-8047-2630-2.
- Whittow, Mark (1996). The Making of Byzantium, 600–1025. Berkeley and Los Angeles, California: University of California Press. ISBN 978-0-520-20496-6.

Court offices
Preceded by Basil Lekapenos	Parakoimomenos of the Byzantine emperor 959–963	Succeeded by Basil Lekapenos
