= Manuel Kourtikes =

Manuel Kourtikes or Kourtikios (Ancient Greek: Μανουήλ Κουρτίκης/Κουρτίκιος) was a Byzantine official and military commander in the 940s.

== Biography ==
The Kourtikios or Kourtikes family was Armenian in origin and entered Byzantine service under Basil I the Macedonian (r. 867–886), when its eponymous founder, K'urdik, ceded his fortress of Lokana to the Empire.

Manuel is mentioned for the first time as one of the officials who conspired with the co-emperor Stephen Lekapenos, when the latter deposed his father, Emperor Romanos I, in December 944. Shortly after, however, Stephen and his brother, Constantine, were in turn deposed by their brother-in-law, the legitimate emperor Constantine VII Porphyrogennetos. Constantine VII raised Manuel to the rank of patrikios and given the post of droungarios tes viglas, a critical position as its holder's chief duty was guarding the emperor on campaign and in the palace. This suggests that Manuel either quickly defected to Constantine VII's side, or that he had been a partisan of the latter all along, and co-operated with the Lekapenoi to get rid of Romanos I, before supporting the restoration of Constantine VII. A similar role is explicitly suggested by the Byzantine historian George Kedrenos for at least one other co-conspirator, Basil Peteinos.

According to the Byzantine chroniclers, Kourtikes died an ignominious death soon after as divine punishment for his deeds. This moralizing fable is almost certainly an invention; Theophanes Continuatus reports that he sunk with his dromon on the way to Crete, likely in the failed expedition of 949 against the Emirate of Crete. Manuel was possibly related to the general Michael Kourtikios, who was active in the 970s.

== Sources ==
- Kazhdan, Alexander, ed. (1991). The Oxford Dictionary of Byzantium. Oxford and New York: Oxford University Press. ISBN 0-19-504652-8.
- Lilie, Ralph-Johannes; Ludwig, Claudia; Pratsch, Thomas; Zielke, Beate (2013). Prosopographie der mittelbyzantinischen Zeit Online. Berlin-Brandenburgische Akademie der Wissenschaften. Nach Vorarbeiten F. Winkelmanns erstellt (in German). Berlin and Boston: De Gruyter.
- Runciman, Steven (1988) [1929]. The Emperor Romanus Lecapenus and His Reign: A Study of Tenth-Century Byzantium. Cambridge: Cambridge University Press. ISBN 0-521-35722-5.
- Whittow, Mark (1996). The Making of Byzantium, 600–1025. Berkeley and Los Angeles, California: University of California Press. ISBN 978-0-520-20496-6.
