= Sophia (wife of Christopher Lekapenos) =

Sophia, was the wife of Byzantine Emperor Christopher Lekapenos, and Augusta of the Byzantine Empire from 921 to 931.

== Biography ==
Sophia was the daughter of the wealthy patrician Niketas, a Slav from the Peloponnese.

Sophia was married to Christopher Lekapenos at some time before his father's ascension to the Byzantine throne in December 920. Christopher was later proclaimed as Caesar, and on 19 May 921, he was crowned co-emperor with his father. From then on, Christopher and Sophia were given leading roles in the court hierarchy, with Sophia even surpassing Helena Lekapene, Constantine VII's wife, in seniority and honors. After the death of Empress Theodora in February 922, Sophia received the title of Augusta alongside her sister-in-law Helena Lekapene. However, Romanos Lekapenos chose Sophia for the role of Zoste patrikia in the imperial palace.

Around 928, Sophia's father, the patrician Niketas, unsuccessfully attempted to incite Christopher into a plot to replace his father on the throne, which lead to Niketas's banishment from Constantinople. A likely motive for the conspiracy was the ill health of Christopher, which raised concerns among Niketas and Sophia regarding their influence at court after his death. Shortly after Christopher died in 931, Sophia retired to a monastery, where she ended her life as a nun.

== Family ==
Sophia had 3 children with Christopher Lekapenos

- Maria-Irene, the empress-consort of Peter I of Bulgaria
- Romanos, who died in infancy
- Michael, an infant at the time of Christopher's death, was made a cleric at the time of the family's fall from power in 945. He eventually garnered several high-ranking positions at the Byzantine court, but nothing further is known of his later life
