= Theodora (daughter of Constantine VII) =

Byzantine empress (born c. 946)

Empress of the Byzantine Empire
- Tenure: 971–976?
- Born: c. 946
- Died: after 971
- Spouse: John I Tzimiskes
- Issue: Theophano
- Father: Constantine VII
- Mother: Helena Lekapene

Theodora (Greek: Θεοδώρα; c. 946 – after 971) was Byzantine empress as the second wife of John I Tzimiskes. She was a daughter of Constantine VII and Helena Lekapene. Her maternal grandparents were Romanos I Lekapenos and Theodora.

The work Theophanes Continuatus was a continuation of the chronicle of Theophanes the Confessor by other writers, active during the reign of her father. The chronicle ends in 961 and records her fate following the death of Constantine VII on 9 November 959. Her brother Romanos II succeeded to the throne and his wife Theophano convinced him to send all five of his sisters to the convent of Kanikleion. Theodora and her sisters Zoe, Agatha, Theophano and Anna were initially held in Kanikleion. Later they were split: Theodora, Zoe, and Theophano were sent to the monastery of Antiochus, while Agatha and Anna were sent to Myrelaion, a nunnery built by their maternal grandfather.

While the sisters were following their monastic lives, changes were occurring in the imperial throne. Romanos II died on 15 March 963. His co-rulers and successors were his underage sons Basil II and Constantine VIII. Their mother served as their regent until marrying victorious general Nikephoros II. Nikephoros rose to the throne as senior emperor. However Theophano and John Tzimiskes, Nikephoros' nephew, organized his assassination on the night of 10–11 December 969.

John became senior emperor in place of Nikephoros. Theophano was exiled to the island of Prinkipos. His previous marriage to Maria Skléraina had solidified an alliance with general Bardas Skleros, but the loyalties of the rest of the Byzantine Empire were not as secure. John rectified the situation by releasing Theodora from Myrelaion and arranging their marriage. According to Leo the Deacon, the marriage occurred in November 971. The Cambridge Medieval History. Vol. IV, The Byzantine Empire (1966) by Joan M. Hussey attributes to this marriage the birth of a daughter, Theophano Kourkouas.

John Tzimiskes died on 10 January 976. Whether Theodora was still alive is not mentioned in medieval sources.

== Notes ==
Theodora (daughter of Constantine VII) Macedonian dynasty Born: 10th century Died: 10th century
Royal titles
| Preceded by Theophano | Byzantine Empress consort 971–976 | Succeeded by Helena |
