= Theodora (wife of Romanos I) =

Byzantine empress from 920 to 922

- Augusta

Empress of the Byzantine Empire
- Tenure: 920–922
- Died: 20 February 922
- Spouse: Romanos I Lekapenos
- Issue Detail: Christopher Lekapenos; Stephen Lekapenos; Constantine Lekapenos; Theophylaktos Lekapenos; Helena Lekapene; Agatha Lekapene

Theodora (Medieval Greek: Θεοδώρα, pronounced [θjoˈðora]; died 20 February 922) was a humble Greek woman who became Byzantine empress consort by marriage to Romanos I Lekapenos.

== Empress ==
Nothing is known of her background except for the fact that she was born into a family of Greek peasants. She became the mother-in-law to Constantine VII in May or June, 919 with the marriage of the young Emperor to her daughter Helena Lekapene. Her husband Romanos was originally the Droungarios of the Fleet, before rising to become the de facto regent of the Empire after the marriage, when he was proclaimed basileopatōr. In September 920, Romanos was invested as kaisar. On 17 December 920, Romanos was crowned co-emperor and in effect became the senior of the two associate emperors. Theodora was crowned as Augusta in January 921. She remained in the position until her death a year later.

== Status as wife ==
She is the only wife of Romanos I mentioned in primary sources and is traditionally considered the mother of all his legitimate children. However, there has been some question if she was only his second wife.

Symeon the Metaphrast identifies a certain magister Niketas as father-in-law of Romanos I. This would presumably make him father to Theodora. However, Niketas is known from other chronicles to be the father of Sophia, wife of Christopher Lekapenos. Christopher was the eldest son of Romanos. The reference is typically ignored as a probable mistake by Symeon. However, "Familles Byzantines" (1975) by Jean-François Vannier interprets the comment to be correct and that both father and son had married daughters of Niketas, which would mean Theodora could not be the mother of Christopher. Her son could not marry her sister. The argument concludes that Christopher is the product of an earlier marriage and Theodora a second wife of Romanos.

== Children ==
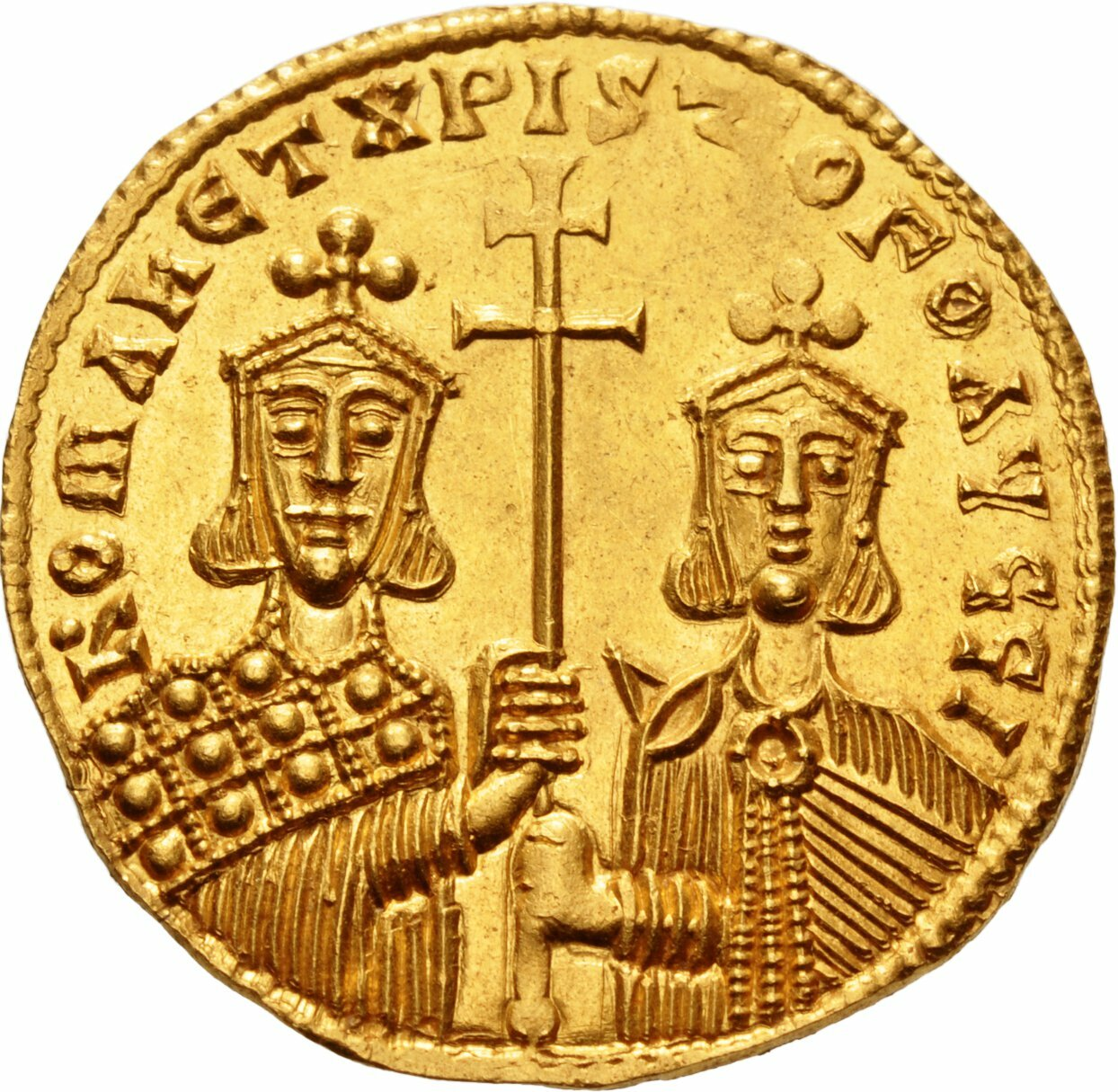
Coin of AD 931 depicting Theodora's widower Romanos and her son Christopher

Her children with Romanos are:

- Christopher Lekapenos, co-emperor from 921 to 931, who was married to the Augusta Sophia and was the father of Maria (renamed Irene), who married Peter I of Bulgaria; Christopher's son Michael Lekapenos may have been associated as co-emperor by his grandfather.
- Stephen Lekapenos, co-emperor from 924 to 945, died 963.
- Constantine Lekapenos, co-emperor from 924 to 945, died 946.
- Theophylaktos Lekapenos, patriarch of Constantinople from 933 to 956.
- Helena Lekapene, who married Emperor Constantine VII.
- Agatha Lekapene, who married Romanos Argyros; their grandson was Emperor Romanos III Argyros.

Royal titles
Preceded by Helena Lekapene	Byzantine Empress consort 920–922 with Helena Lekapene (920–922)	Succeeded by Helena Lekapene
Preceded by Zoe Karbonopsina	Empress-Mother of the Byzantine Empire; January 921 – February 20, 922; Titled as the Empress’ Mother, as she was mother to Helena Lekapene, and an Empress in her own right.	Succeeded by Helena Lekapene
