= Arslan Hane, Istanbul =

Byzantine church in Istanbul

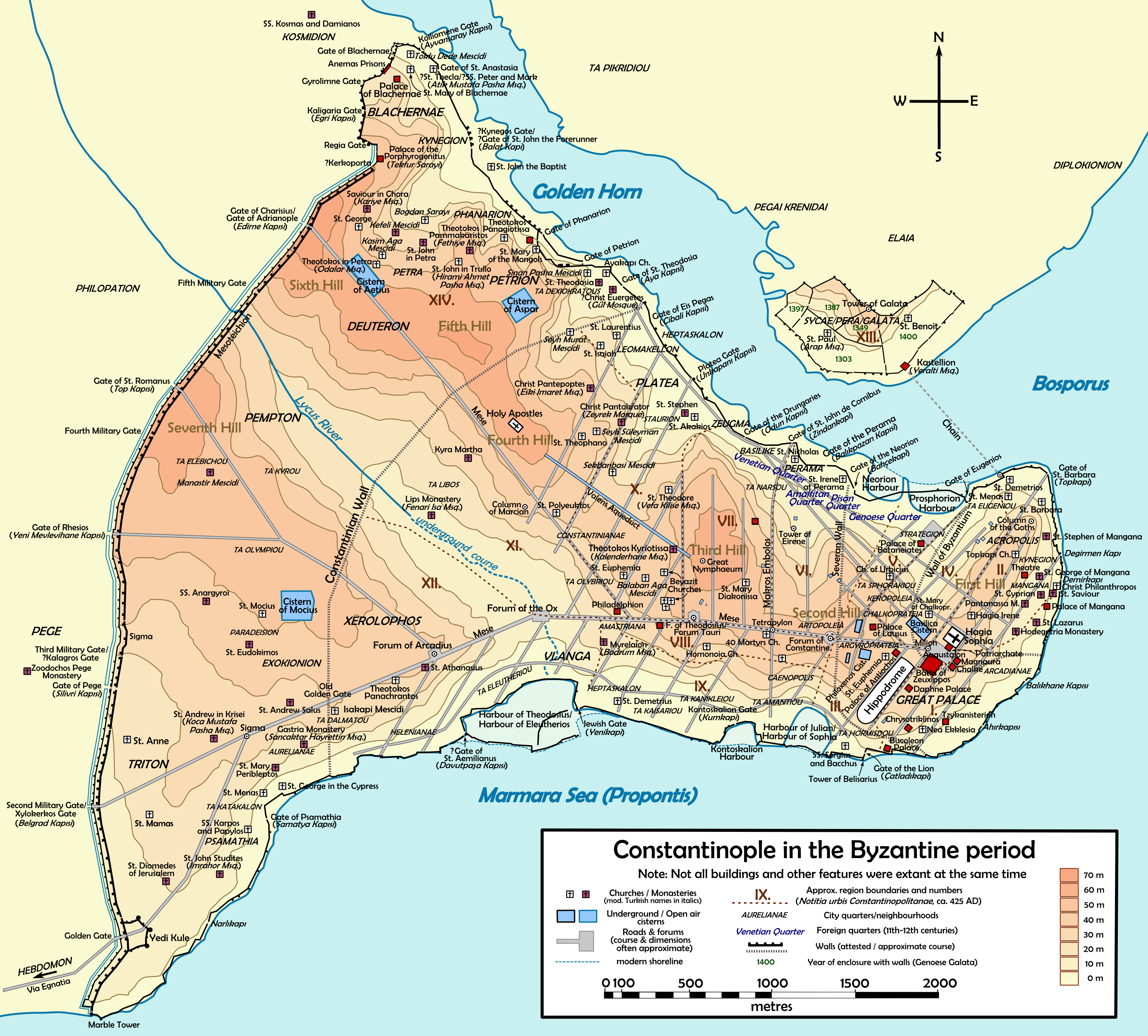
Map of Byzantine Constantinople. The Arslan Hane - not shown on the map - is located in the easternmost part of the walled city, south of the Hagia Sophia and left of the Chalke.

Arslan Hane (Turkish for Lion's shelter; also Arslanhane) was a Byzantine Eastern Orthodox church converted into a secular building by the Ottomans in Istanbul, Turkey. The Church was dedicated to Christ of the Chalke (Greek: Χριστὸς τῆς Χαλκῆς), after the image of the Savior ("Christ Chalkites") framed above the main entrance of the nearby Chalke Gate. This building, whose name stems possibly from its doors or tiles made with bronze (in Greek chálkeos), was the monumental vestibule of the Great Palace of Constantinople. The desecrated church, already heavily damaged by fire, was demolished in 1804.

== Location ==
The structure was located in Istanbul, in the district of Fatih, in the neighborhood of Sultanahmet, about 200 m (660 ft) south of the Hagia Sophia, not far from the Column of Justinian and to the left of the Chalke Gate of the Great Palace, both disappeared.

== History ==
=== Byzantine Age ===
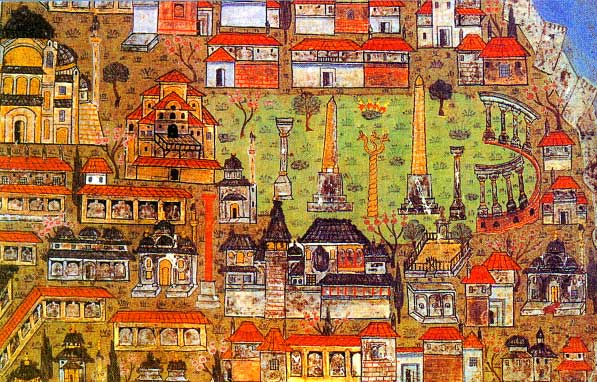
Miniature of the Hippodrome of Constantinople by Ottoman Miniaturist Matrakci Nasuh, appeared in 1536. The Arslan Hane is the large red-orange domed building with a terrace, just left of the blooming meadow (the former Hippodrome site) and right of the Hagia Sophia

In the tenth century, Emperor Romanos Lekapenos erected near the Chalke a chapel dedicated to Christ Chalkites, the name of the image of Jesus that adorned the main entrance of the Chalke. This image - being one of the major religious symbols of the city - had great importance during the Iconoclastic period. The shrine was so small that it could contain no more than fifteen people. In 971, Emperor John I Tzimiskes enlarged the chapel, building a two-storey church to celebrate his victory against the Kievan Rus', and endowed it with a 50-member clergy. The new building, which was erected in part using material from the nearby Palace Baths "tou oikonomíou", which was already in ruins, was lavishly decorated. John I was buried in the church's crypt in 976. In 1183, Andronikos Komnenos was proclaimed Emperor here, in association with the young Emperor Alexios II Komnenos, who was put to death immediately afterward. According to a Russian pilgrim, the church was still in use in the second quarter of the fifteenth century.

=== Ottoman Age ===
After the Fall of Constantinople to the Ottomans in 1453, the hostel of the combat engineers (Turkish: Cebehane) was placed near the church, and the church was abandoned. Afterwards, like the nearby Church of St. John at Dihippion, the ground floor of the building was used to house the wild animals (lions - whence its Turkish name, Arslan hane - tigers, elephants, etc.) intended for the court of the Sultan in the nearby Topkapı Palace. At the same time, the upper floor had its windows walled and was used to lodge the fresco painters and miniaturists active in the Sultan's Palace (Turkish: Nakkaş hane). In 1741 a fire in the Hagia Sophia neighborhood damaged the building, as well as the nearby Haseki Hürrem Sultan Bath. In 1802 the upper floor caught fire, and in 1804 the building was demolished. There were numerous fires in the following years in the new edifices built on the site, until in 1846-48 the Swiss Italian architect Gaspare Fossati built the main seat of the new Istanbul University on the same site.

== Description ==
About the first chapel it is only known that two marble columns used for its construction were brought from Thessaloniki. A representation of the city belonging to the 1493 Nuremberg Chronicle, another of 1532 painted by Nasûh al Matrakçî, and an engraving in a geography book published in Venice in 1804 are the only three extant images of the church, although in the latter the building is represented as already in ruins. The edifice appears to be made of ashlar and brick, with a central plan and two storeys surmounted by a dome. The upper storey was flanked by two half domes and was preceded by a terrace. Both storeys were pierced by windows. Internally the church was adorned with precious vases and icons (such as the famous icon of Christ coming from Beirut), and lavishly decorated with paintings and mosaics. The remains of these, as well as of inscriptions in Greek, were still visible in the interior until the eighteenth century. John Tzimiskes endowed the church with several relics, among them the alleged sandals of Jesus and the hair of St. John the Baptist, and had his tomb, made of gold and enamel, built in the crypt.

== Notes ==
- Balbi, Adriano (1824). Compendio di Geografia universale (in Italian) (3 ed.). Venezia: Glauco Masi.
- Mamboury, Ernest (1953). The Tourists' Istanbul. Istanbul: Çituri Biraderler Basımevi.
- Janin, Raymond (1953). La Géographie Ecclésiastique de l'Empire Byzantin. 1. Part: Le Siège de Constantinople et le Patriarcat Oecuménique. 3rd Vol. : Les Églises et les Monastères (in French). Paris: Institut Français d'Etudes Byzantines.
- Janin, Raymond (1964). Constantinople Byzantine (in French) (2 ed.). Paris: Institut Français d'Etudes Byzantines.
- Müller-Wiener, Wolfgang (1977). Bildlexikon zur Topographie Istanbuls: Byzantion, Konstantinupolis, Istanbul bis zum Beginn d. 17 Jh (in German). Tübingen: Wasmuth. ISBN 9783803010223.
- Ronchey, Silvia; Braccini, Tommaso (2010). Il romanzo di Costantinopoli. Guida letteraria alla Roma d'Oriente (in Italian). Torino: Einaudi. ISBN 978-88-06-18921-1.
- Brubaker, Leslie; Haldon, John (2011). Byzantium in the Iconoclast era (ca 680-850). Cambridge: Cambridge University Press. ISBN 978-05-21-43093-7.
