= Sebastophoros =

The sebastophoros (Greek: σεβαστοφόρος) was a high Byzantine court position and rank reserved for eunuchs in the 10th–12th centuries. Its functions are unclear.

== History and functions ==
The office is first attested in the Escorial Taktikon of circa 975. Nicolas Oikonomides suggested that it was introduced sometime between 963 and 975. In the Escorial Taktikon, it is ranked as one of the highest dignities, after the proedros and before the magistroi, and was usually reserved for eunuchs.

The first known holder was Romanos Lekapenos, the son of Stephen Lekapenos and grandson of Emperor Romanos I Lekapenos (r. 920–944), but Oikonomides suggested that the title may have been first created for Basil Lekapenos, the powerful parakoimomenos and long-time first minister of the Byzantine Empire.

The functions of the sebastophoros are unclear; the name may imply that he carried the emperor's banner, or that he was a personal messenger of the emperor, a role some of its holders are known to have fulfilled. The title was quickly devalued, already during the 11th century: on seals, it is combined with relatively modest offices in the Byzantine imperial hierarchy. It disappeared completely after the 12th century.

In some texts, namely the Patria of Constantinople and the Suda lexicon, the sebastophoroi are identified as officials of the districts (regeonai, "regions") of Constantinople, who every year on October 5 performed dances before the Byzantine emperor. This statement, however, comes from the 6th-century antiquarian writer John Lydus, who alleges that this practice existed under Emperor Tiberius (r. 14–37), i.e. in Rome.

== Known holders ==
- Romanos Lekapenos, grandson of Emperor Romanos I Lekapenos (r. 920–944), he was castrated while young in 945, and was probably still alive in 975.
- Stephen Pergamenos, eunuch official who notified Emperor Constantine IX Monomachos (r. 1042–1055) of his accession in 1042, and was rewarded with the dignity of sebastophoros. He suppressed the revolt of George Maniakes, but later conspired against the Emperor and was tonsured.
- Nikephoritzes, the unpopular eunuch chief minister of Emperor Michael VII Doukas (r. 1071–1078). He bore the title during his tenure as doux of Antioch in 1059–1060.
- John Pepagomenos, household member (oikeios) of Emperor Alexios I Komnenos (r. 1081–1118), attested in the synod that condemned John Italos in 1082.

A few other seals of sebastophoroi are known from the 10th–12th centuries, but their owners are not otherwise known.

== Sources ==
- Guilland, Rodolphe (1963). "Études sur l'histoire administrative de l'Empire byzantin: le sébastophore". Revue des études byzantines (in French). 21: 199–207. doi:10.3406/rebyz.1963.1307.
- Kazhdan, Alexander (1991). "Sebastophoros". In Kazhdan, Alexander (ed.). The Oxford Dictionary of Byzantium. Oxford and New York: Oxford University Press. p. 1862. ISBN 0-19-504652-8.
- Oikonomides, Nicolas (1972). Les listes de préséance byzantines des IXe et Xe siècles (in French). Paris: Editions du Centre National de la Recherche Scientifique.
