= Basil Peteinos =

10th-century Byzantine official

Basil Peteinos (Ancient Greek: Βασίλειος Πετεινός) was a senior Byzantine official under Emperor Constantine VII Porphyrogennetos, who led an abortive conspiracy against Romanos II in 961.

== Biography ==
According to the account of John Skylitzes, which offers the most details on his life, Basil Peteinos was a childhood friend and confidant of Constantine VII Porphyrogennetos. By 944, he was serving as a member of the imperial bodyguard, the Hetaireia, when he became a leading member in the plot of Stephen Lekapenos and Constantine Lekapenos to depose their father, the ruling senior emperor Romanos I (r. 920–944). According to the historians, Peteinos was acting on behalf of Constantine VII, urging the two brothers to complete the deed. Indeed, on 20 December 944, Romanos I was deposed and banished to a monastery, but within weeks, the two Lekapenoi brothers were outmanoeuvred and sent to join their father by Constantine VII, who now became sole emperor. As a reward, Peteinos was given the high rank of patrikios, and made commander of the Hetaireia (megas hetaireiarches).

The history of Theophanes Continuatus claims that Peteinos conspired against Constantine VII as well, was discovered, and exiled, but this is incorrect. Indeed, Peteinos was a high-ranking member of Constantine VII's court; according to the hagiography of Luke the Stylite, he was later promoted to the highest court rank, that of magistros, was a friend of Patriarch Theophylact of Constantinople (r. 933–956) and was healed by Luke from a kidney disease.

While remaining loyal to Constantine VII throughout the latter's reign, after his death in 959, he led a conspiracy against Constantine's son and successor, Romanos II (r. 959–963). The conspiracy apparently encompassed several leading members of the court, with the purpose of assassinating Romanos II and raising Peteinos to the throne instead. The plot was revealed in March 961 by one of the conspirators, leading to the arrest of all participants. Peteinos was spared the torture inflicted on the others, but they were all publicly humiliated by being paraded through the streets of Constantinople, before being tonsured and exiled. The others were pardoned by Romanos II, but Peteinos remained in banishment on the island of Prokonnesos until his death.

== Sources ==
- Lilie, Ralph-Johannes; Ludwig, Claudia; Pratsch, Thomas; Zielke, Beate (2013). Prosopographie der mittelbyzantinischen Zeit Online. Berlin-Brandenburgische Akademie der Wissenschaften. Nach Vorarbeiten F. Winkelmanns erstellt (in German). Berlin and Boston: De Gruyter.
- Runciman, Steven (1988) [1929]. The Emperor Romanus Lecapenus and His Reign: A Study of Tenth-Century Byzantium. Cambridge: Cambridge University Press. ISBN 0-521-35722-5.
