= Romanos Argyros (10th century) =

Romanos Argyros (Greek: Ῥωμανός Ἀργυρός) was a Byzantine aristocrat and son-in-law of Emperor Romanos I Lekapenos.

== Life ==
He was a son of the distinguished general Leo Argyros, and had at least one brother, Marianos Argyros, who also occupied high military posts. Romanos on the other hand is chiefly known for having married Agathe, a daughter of Emperor Romanos I Lekapenos (reigned 919–944). The sources disagree on when the marriage took place: the 11th-century historian Yahya of Antioch asserts that the marriage took place before Lekapenos' rise to power, while the late 10th-century chronicler Theophanes Continuatus records that it took place in 921. In either case, the marriage represented an effort by Lekapenos, a provincial upstart, to solidify his position by linking his family to one of the most prestigious aristocratic families of the Empire.

As such, Romanos became the brother-in-law of Constantine VII Porphyrogennetos, who had married another of Lekapenos' daughters, Helena Lekapene. His grandson was Emperor Romanos III Argyros (r. 1028–34), who became emperor by marrying Empress Zoe, the great-granddaughter of Constantine VII.

== Sources ==
- Cheynet, J.-C.; Vannier, J.-F. (2003). "Les Argyroi" (PDF). Zbornik Radova Vizantološkog Instituta (in French). 40: 57–90. doi:10.2298/ZRVI0340057C. ISSN 0584-9888. Archived from the original (PDF) on 2011-07-23.
- Runciman, Steven (1988) [1929]. The Emperor Romanus Lecapenus and His Reign: A Study of Tenth-Century Byzantium. Cambridge, United Kingdom: Cambridge University Press. ISBN 0-521-35722-5.
