= Irene Lekapene =

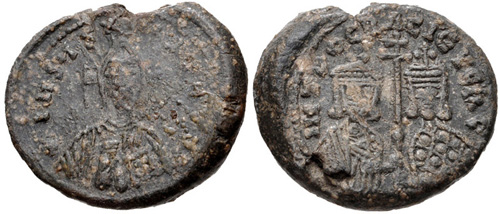
- Seal depicting Irene with Peter I

Empress consort of Bulgaria
- Born: Unknown; Byzantine Empire
- Died: before 963
- Spouse: Peter I of Bulgaria
- Issue: Plenimir, Boris II, Roman
- Father: Christopher Lekapenos
- Mother: Sophia

Irene Lekapene (born Maria; Bulgarian: Ирина Лакапина, Greek: Μαρία/Ειρήνη Λεκαπηνή, died before 963) was the Empress consort of Peter I of Bulgaria. She was a daughter of Christopher Lekapenos, son and co-emperor of Romanos I Lekapenos, and his wife Augusta Sophia.

To prove himself a worthy successor to his father both at home and in the eyes of foreign governments, Bulgaria's new emperor Peter I made a show of force by invading Byzantine Thrace in May 927, but showed himself ready to negotiate for a more permanent peace. Romanos seized the occasion and proposed a marriage alliance between the imperial houses of Byzantium and Bulgaria to end the War of 913–927. Romanos arranged for a diplomatic marriage between his granddaughter Maria and the Bulgarian monarch. For the first time in Byzantine history, a Byzantine princess was to be married to a foreign ruler; decades later, Romanos' son-in-law and co-ruler Constantine VII criticized Romanos for this concession. In October 927 Peter arrived near Constantinople to meet Romanos and signed the peace treaty, marrying Maria on November 8. To signify the new era in Bulgaro-Byzantine relations, Maria was renamed Irene ("peace").

== Death ==
The exact year of Maria Lekapene’s death is unknown. Her death is mentioned by the Byzantine chroniclers John Skylitzes and John Zonaras, the latter of whom relied on Skylitzes. Since the account is embedded in the narrative of the events of the final years of Emperor Romanos II, some scholars date Maria’s death to 963. However, according to Brzozowska and Leszka, this year should be regarded as the latest possible date for her death, rather than as a firmly established year. She may have died as early as the beginning of the 960s, or even before 958, when Liutprand of Cremona began writing his work Antapodosis, in which Peter is portrayed as the only surviving member among several previously mentioned rulers and members of the Lekapenos family.

The circumstances of her death are unknown. There is no reliable evidence that she became a nun in the final years of her life. The authors suggest that she most likely died as a laywoman, since female rulers who retired to monasteries received particular attention in the medieval Bulgarian literary tradition. Her death is sometimes linked to the deterioration of Bulgarian–Byzantine relations, but the available sources do not allow a causal connection between the two events to be established with certainty.

== Family ==
Irene and Peter I of Bulgaria had several children, including:

- Plenimir
- Boris II, who succeeded as emperor of Bulgaria in 969
- Roman, who succeeded as emperor of Bulgaria in 977
