= Helena Lekapene =

Byzantine empress from 919 to 959

- Augusta
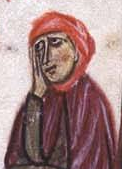
- Helena, from the 12th century Madrid Skylitzes

Empress consort of the Byzantine Empire
- Tenure: 919–959 (with Theodora; 920–922 with Theophano, 956–959)
- Born: c. 910
- Died: 19 September 961 (aged 50–51)
- Spouse: Constantine VII
- Issue more...: Romanos II; Theodora
- Dynasty: Lekapenos; Macedonian (by marriage)
- Father: Romanos I
- Mother: Theodora
- Religion: Chalcedonian Christianity

Helena Lekapene (Medieval Greek: Ἑλένη Λεκαπηνή, romanized: Lecapena) (c. 910 – 19 September 961) was the empress consort of Constantine VII, known to have acted as his political adviser and de facto co-regent. She was a daughter of Romanos I Lekapenos and Theodora.

== Background ==
The deaths of Emperor Leo VI the Wise in 912 and his brother and successor Alexander in 913 left the throne of the Byzantine Empire to Constantine VII. Constantine was only seven years old when he assumed the throne. The empire was placed in the care of regents.

Nicholas Mystikos, ecumenical patriarch of Constantinople, was the principal regent until March 914. He was displaced by Zoe Karbonopsina, mother of the young emperor. Zoe reigned with the support of influential general Leo Phocas until 919. However, Leo led the Byzantine army into a series of lost battles against Simeon I of Bulgaria in one campaign of the Byzantine-Bulgarian Wars. This strengthened the opposition to the regent and her favorite general.

In 919, a coup d'état involving various factions managed to remove Zoe from power. The new effective regent was Romanos Lekapenos, Droungarios (admiral) of the Byzantine navy. Romanos orchestrated the marriage of Helena to Constantine VII as a way to secure a connection to the legitimate Macedonian dynasty.

== Reign of Romanos ==
The work Theophanes Continuatus was a continuation of the chronicle of Theophanes the Confessor by other writers, active during the reign of her husband. The description of her marriage in the chronicle places the event in April or May 919. Constantine was still four or five months short of his 14th birthday. The Helena's age is not recorded but she was likely also of minor age. They would not have children until the 930s.

Romanos was proclaimed basileopatōr ("father of the emperor") on the occasion of the marriage. In September 920, Romanos was invested as kaisar (Caesar). On 17 December 920, Romanos was crowned co-emperor and in effect became the senior of the two associate emperors.

Helena now was married to the junior co-ruler. Her mother Theodora was crowned Augusta in January 921 and was her senior in palace hierarchy until Theodora's death on 20 February 922. Helena became in effect the senior co-empress of the palace following the death of her mother. Her brother Christopher Lekapenos became co-emperor in 921. Before his elevation to the throne, Christopher was married to Sophia, daughter of magistros Niketas. Sophia was crowned empress in February 922. They had three children.

In 924, there was a senior emperor (Romanos), two junior emperors (Constantine VII and Christopher), and two empresses (Helena and Sophia). However Romanos crowned two more of his sons as co-emperors, Stephen Lekapenos and Constantine Lekapenos. By 933, Stephen was married to Anna, daughter of Gabalos. No children are mentioned by the chronicle. By 939, Constantine Lekapenos was married to another Helena, daughter of patrikios Hadrian. This other Helena died on 14 January 940, and Constantine married Theophano Mamas on 2 February 940. Constantine had a son but the identity of the child's mother was not recorded.

With the favor of Romanos, Christopher held seniority among the four junior co-emperors. He was the heir to the throne while Constantine VII, Stephen, and Constantine Lekapenos were to remain junior co-rulers. However, Christopher died in 931. Romanos did not advance his younger sons in precedence over Constantine VII. His son-in-law was now the heir over his own sons. Helena was bound to become the principal empress upon the death of her father.

This period lasted until 16 December 944. Fearing that Romanos would allow Constantine VII to succeed him instead of them, his younger sons Stephen and Constantine arrested their father and took him to the Prince Islands, compelling him to become a monk.

== Reign of Constantine ==
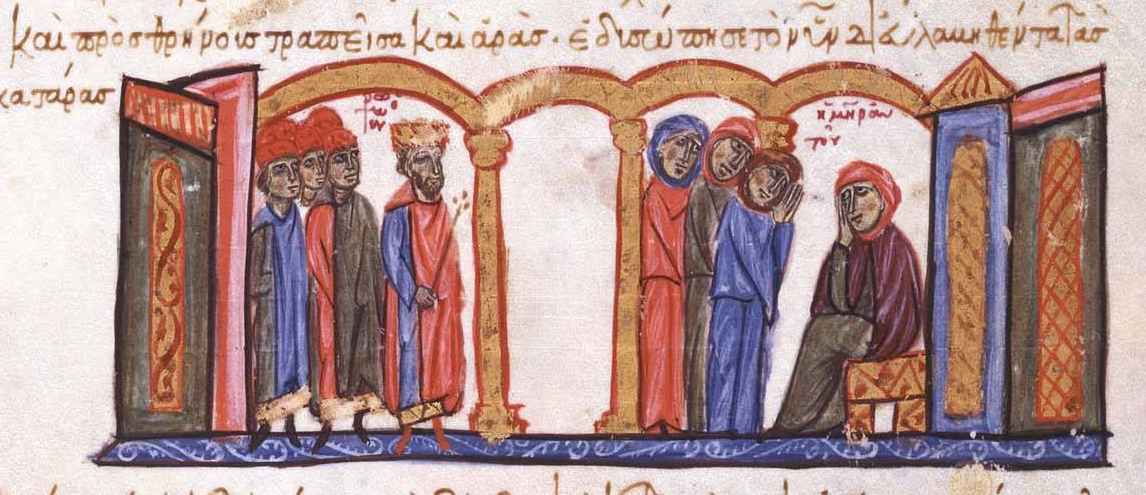
Romanos II expels his mother and sisters from the palace.

Constantine VII was restored to his position as senior emperor after 24 years as junior co-ruler. On 27 January 945, his brothers-in-law and co-rulers Stephen and Constantine were also deposed. They were sent into exile, leaving Constantine VII sole emperor. Helena was by then the only empress. Having never exercised executive authority, Constantine remained primarily devoted to his scholarly pursuits and relegated his authority to bureaucrats and generals as well as his energetic wife Helena.

Romanos II was the co-ruler and heir. When Constantine VII died on 9 November 959, Romanos II succeeded him to the throne. His own wife Theophano convinced him to send all five of his sisters to the convent of Kanikleion. Helena seems to have retired from palace life after this point. Her death on 19 September 961 is among the last events recorded in the Theophanes Continuatus chronicle.

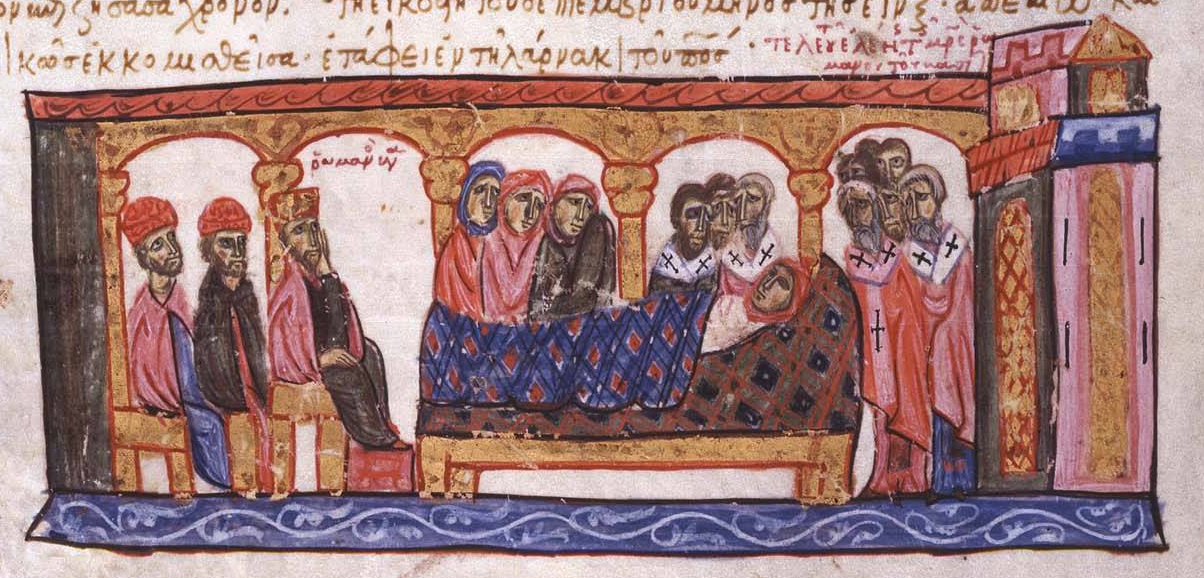
Depiction of Helena on her deathbed.

== Issue ==
With Constantine VII:

- Leo, who died young.
- Romanos II.
- Zoe, sent to a convent.
- Theodora, who married Emperor John I Tzimiskes.
- Agatha, sent to a convent.
- Theophano, sent to a convent.
- Anna, sent to a convent.

Royal titles
Preceded by Zoe Karbonopsina	Byzantine Empress consort 919–959 with Theodora (920–922); Theophano (956–959)	Succeeded by Theophano
