= Romanos I Lekapenos =

Byzantine emperor from 920 to 944

- Emperor and Autocrat of the Romans
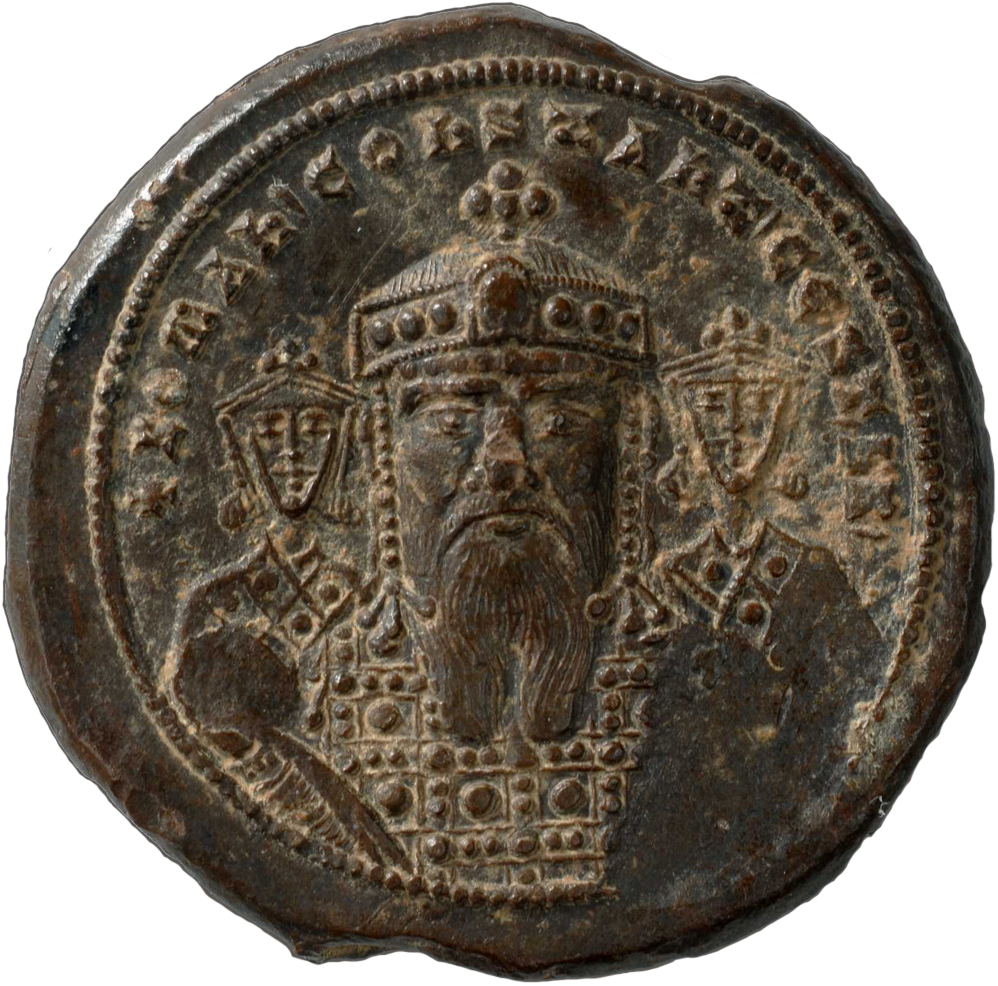
- Portrait of Romanos I on a contemporary seal, flanked by Constantine VII and Stephen Lekapenos. Dumbarton Oaks collection.

Byzantine emperor
- Basileus: 17 December 920 – 20 December 944
- Predecessor: Constantine VII (under regent rule)
- Successor: Constantine VII (alone)
- Co-emperors: See list: Christopher Lekapenos (921–931); Stephen Lekapenos (924–944); Constantine Lekapenos (924–944); Romanos Lekapenos(c. 924)
- Caesar: 24 September 920 – 17 December 920
Pre-imperial positions
Basileopator
In office April 919 – 24 September 920
Monarchs	Constantine VII
Megas Hetaireiarches Magistros
In office 25 March 919 – April 919
Monarch	Constantine VII
Succeeded by	Christopher Lekapenos
Droungarios of the Fleet Patrikios
In office c.917 – 25 March 919
Monarchs	Zoe Karbonopsina; Constantine VII
Strategos of Samos
In office c. 911 – c. 912
Monarchs	Leo VI the Wise; Alexander
- Born: c. 870; Lakape (modern-day Turkey)
- Died: 15 June 948 (aged 77–78)
- Burial: Myrelaion Monastery (modern-day Istanbul)
- Consort: Theodora
- Issue more...: Christopher; Stephanos; Constantine; Helena; Theophylact; Basil (ill.)
- Dynasty: Macedonian/Lekapenos
- Father: Theophylaktos Abastaktos

Romanos I Lakapenos or Lekapenos (Greek: Ῥωμανός Λακαπηνός or Λεκαπηνός, romanized: Rōmanos Lakapēnos or Lekapēnos; c. 870 – 15 June 948), Latinized as Romanus I Lacapenus or Romanus I Lecapenus, was Byzantine emperor from 920 until his deposition in 944, serving as regent for and senior co-ruler of the young Constantine VII.

== Origin ==
Romanos derived his epithet Lekapenos, now usually treated as a family name, from his birthplace of Lakape (later Laqabin) between Melitene and Samosata. It is found mostly as Lakapenos in the sources, although English-language scholarship in particular prefers the form Lekapenos, in large part due to Sir Steven Runciman's 1928 study on the emperor. He was the son of a peasant with the remarkable name of Theophylact "the Unbearable" (Theophylaktos Abaktistos or Abastaktos), who had rescued the Emperor Basil I from the enemy in battle at Tephrike in 872, saving his life, and had been rewarded by a place in the Imperial Guard and received estates as a reward. Theophylaktos is usually identified as Armenian. Byzantinist Anthony Kaldellis contests this, saying that Armenian ancestry is not mentioned in the many Byzantine sources which discuss Romanos, and that Theophylaktos' alleged ethnicity is an assumption based on his being born in humble circumstances in the Armeniac Theme. The assumption has been repeated so often in literature that it has acquired the status of a known fact, even though it is based on the most tenuous of indirect connections.

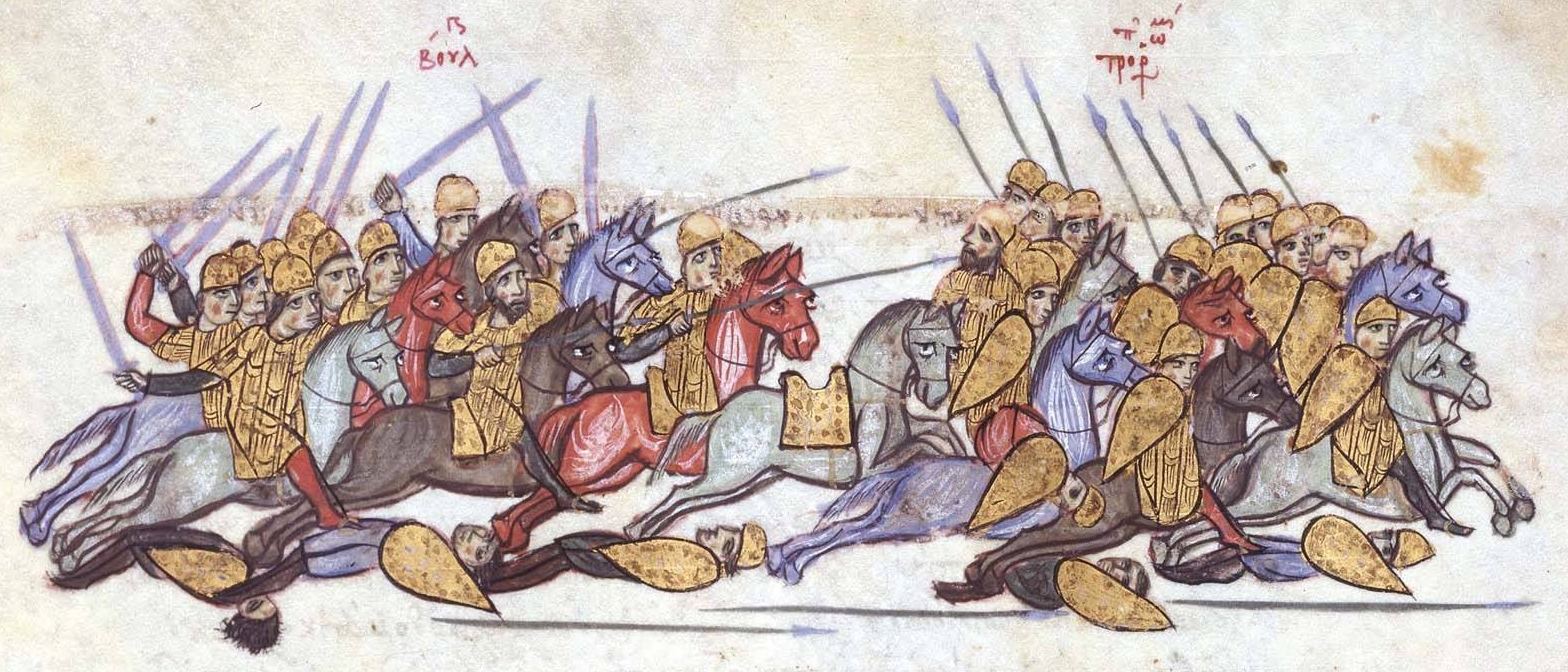
Bulgarian forces rout the Byzantines at Anchialos in 917.

Although he did not receive any refined education (for which he was later abused by his son-in-law Constantine VII), Lekapenos advanced through the ranks of the army during the reign of Emperor Leo VI the Wise. In 911 he was general of the naval theme of Samos and later served as admiral of the fleet (droungarios tou ploimou). In this capacity he was supposed to participate in the Byzantine operations against Bulgaria on the Danube in 917, but he was unable to carry out his mission. In the aftermath of the disastrous Byzantine defeat at the Battle of Acheloos in 917 by the Bulgarians, Lekapenos sailed to Constantinople, where he gradually overcame the discredited regency of Empress Zoe Karvounopsina and her supporter Leo Phokas.

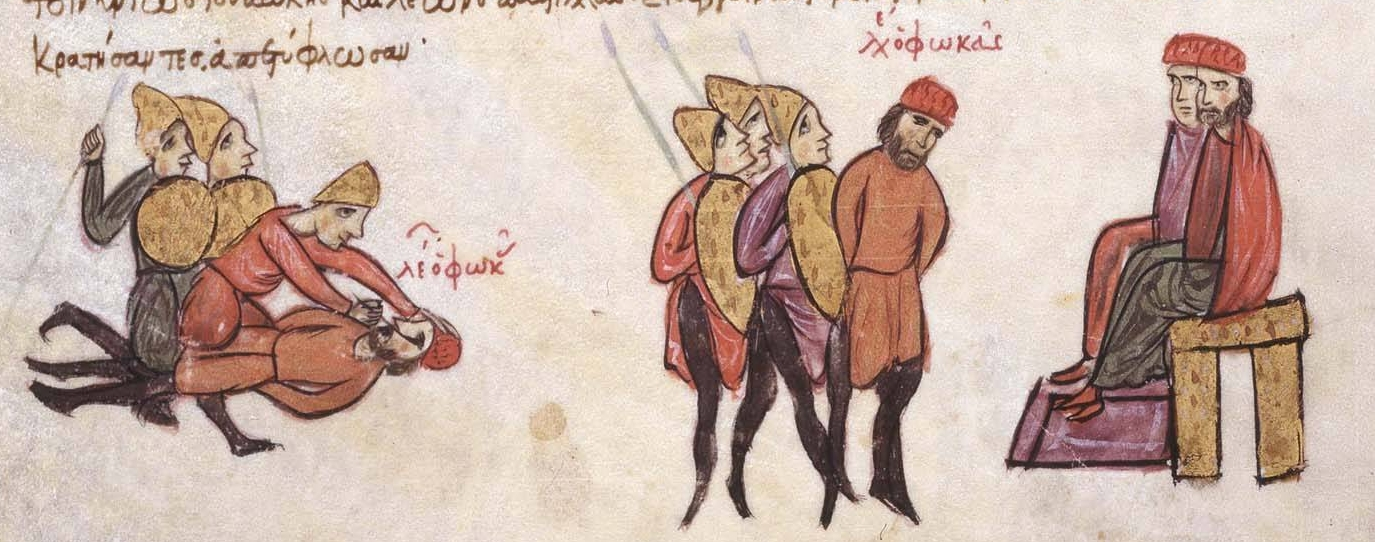
The blinding of Leo Phokas on the orders of Romanos Lekapenos.

== Rise to power ==
On 25 March 919, at the head of his fleet, Lekapenos seized the Boukoleon Palace and the reins of government. Initially, he was named magistros and megas hetaireiarches, but he moved swiftly to consolidate his position: in April 919 his daughter Helena was married to Constantine VII, and Lekapenos assumed the new title basileopator. He was named caesar on 24 September 920 and crowned senior emperor on 17 December.

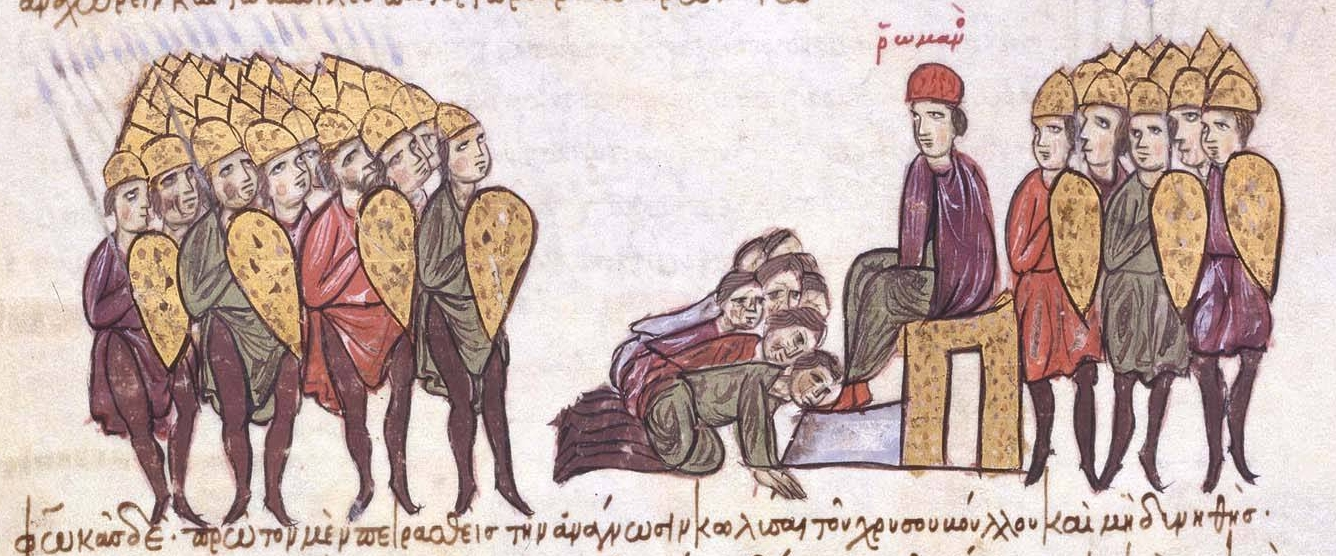
Leo Phokas' supporters surrender to Romanos Lekapenos.

In subsequent years Romanos crowned his own sons co-emperors, Christopher in 921, Stephen and Constantine in 924, although, for the time being, Constantine VII was regarded as first in rank after Romanos himself. It is notable that, as he left Constantine VII untouched, he was called 'the gentle usurper'. Romanos strengthened his position by marrying his daughters to members of the powerful aristocratic families of Argyros and Mouseles, by recalling the deposed patriarch Nicholas Mystikos, and by putting an end to the conflict with the Papacy over the four marriages of Emperor Leo VI.

His early reign saw several conspiracies to topple him, which led to the successive dismissal of his first paradynasteuontes, John the Rhaiktor and John Mystikos. From 925 and until the end of his reign, the post was occupied by the chamberlain Theophanes.

== War and peace with Bulgaria ==
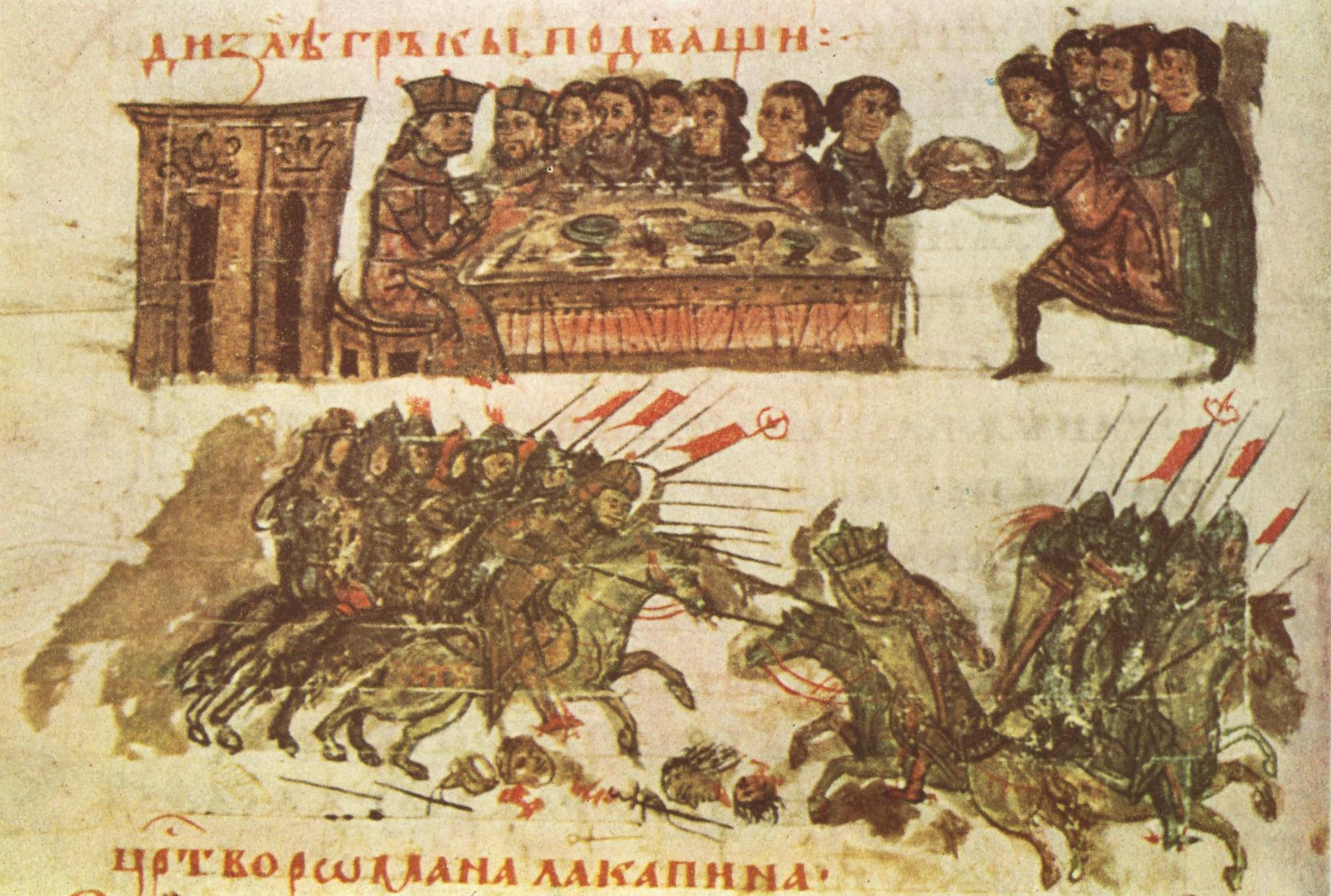
A feast in honor of Simeon I of Bulgaria and Romanos engaging the Bulgarians, from the 14th century Manasses Chronicle.

The first major challenge faced by the new emperor was the war with Bulgaria, which had been re-ignited by the regency of Zoe. The rise to power of Romanos had curtailed the plans of Simeon I of Bulgaria for a marital alliance with Constantine VII, and Romanos was determined to deny the unpopular concession of imperial recognition to Simeon, which had already toppled two imperial governments. Consequently, the first four years of Romanos' reign were spent in warfare against Bulgaria. Although Simeon generally had the upper hand, he was unable to gain a decisive advantage because of the impregnability of Constantinople's walls. In 924, when Simeon had once again blockaded the capital by land, Romanos succeeded in opening negotiations.

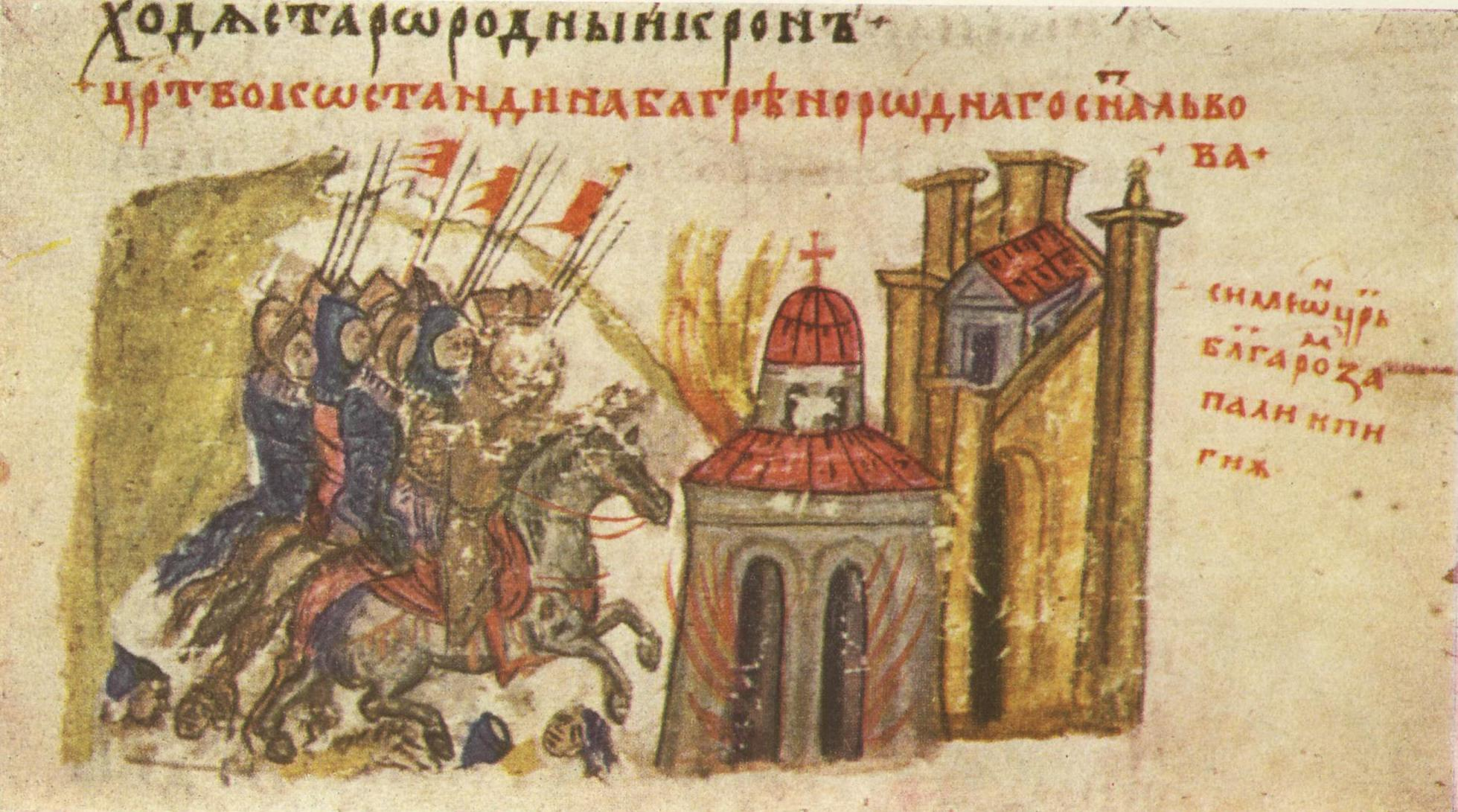
Simeon orders the burning of the Church of St. Mary of the Spring outside the Theodosian Walls.

Meeting Simeon in person at Kosmidion, Romanos criticized Simeon's disregard for tradition and Orthodox Christian brotherhood and supposedly shamed him into coming to terms and lifting the siege. In reality, this was accomplished by Romanos' tacit recognition of Simeon as emperor of Bulgaria. Relations were subsequently marred by continued wrangling over titles (Simeon called himself emperor of the Romans as well), but peace had been effectively established.

On the death of Simeon in May 927, Bulgaria's new emperor, Peter I, made a show of force by invading Byzantine Thrace, but he showed himself ready to negotiate for a more permanent peace. Romanos seized the occasion and proposed a marriage alliance between the imperial houses of Byzantium and Bulgaria, at the same time renewing the Serbian-Byzantine alliance with Časlav of Serbia, returning independence the same year. In September 927 Peter arrived before Constantinople and married Maria (renamed Eirene, "Peace"), the daughter of Romanos' eldest son and co-emperor Christopher, and thus his granddaughter. On this occasion Christopher received precedence in rank over his brother-in-law Constantine VII, something which compounded the latter's resentment towards the Lekapenoi, the Bulgarians, and imperial marriages to outsiders (as documented in his composition De Administrando Imperio). From this point on, Romanos' government was free from direct military confrontation with Bulgaria. Although Byzantium would tacitly support a Serbian revolt against Bulgaria in 931, and the Bulgarians would allow Magyar raids across their territory into Byzantine possessions, Byzantium and Bulgaria remained at peace for 40 years, until Sviatoslav's invasion of Bulgaria.

== Campaigns in the East ==
Romanos appointed the brilliant general John Kourkouas commander of the field armies (domestikos ton scholon) in the East. John Kourkouas subdued a rebellion in the theme of Chaldia and intervened in Armenia in 924. From 926 Kourkouas campaigned across the eastern frontier against the Abbasids and their vassals, and won an important victory at Melitene in 934. The capture of this city is often considered the first major Byzantine territorial recovery from the Muslims.

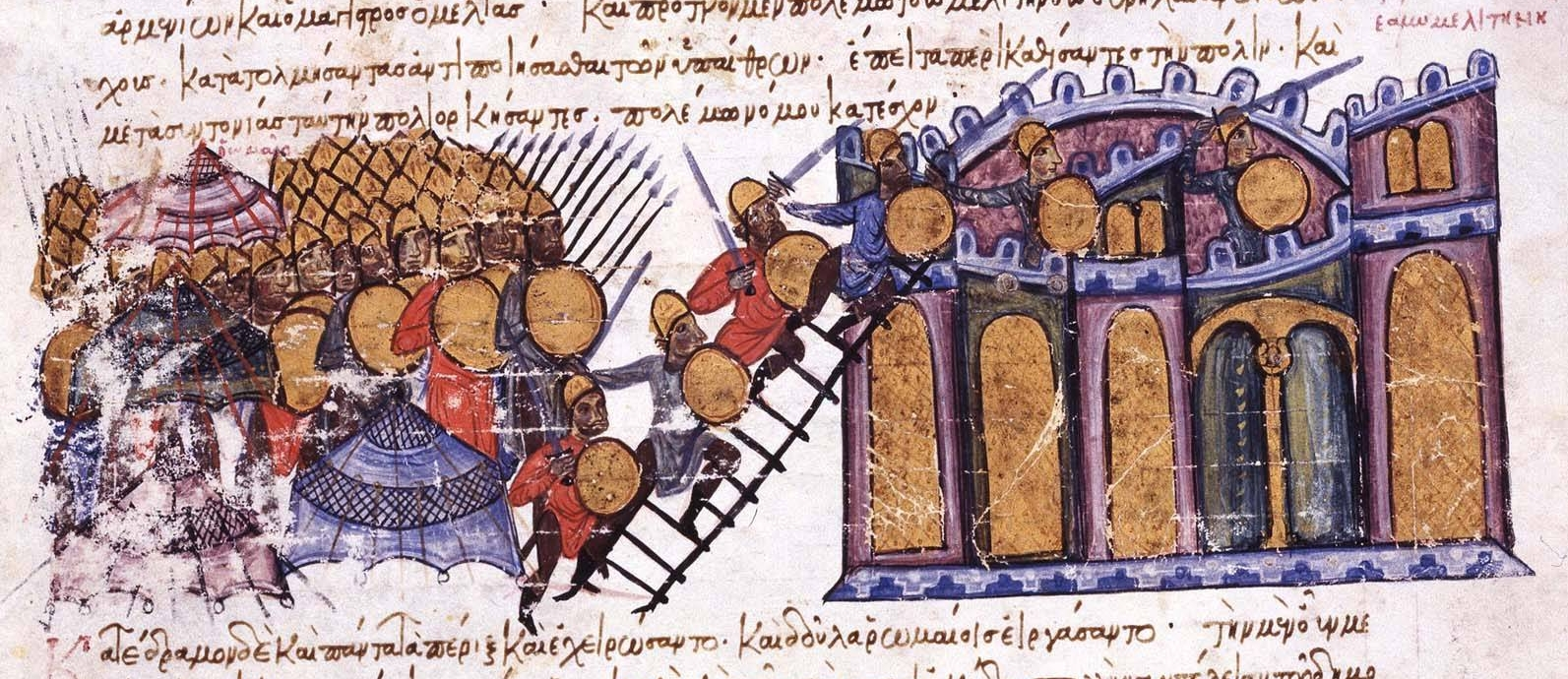
The army under general John Kourkouas takes the city of Melitene.

In 941, while most of the army under Kourkouas was absent in the East, a fleet of 15 old ships under the protovestiarios Theophanes had to defend Constantinople from a Kievan raid. The invaders were defeated at sea, through the use of Greek fire, and again at land, when they landed in Bithynia, by the returning army under Kourkouas. In 944 Romanos concluded a treaty with Prince Igor of Kiev. This crisis having passed, Kourkouas was free to return to the eastern frontier.

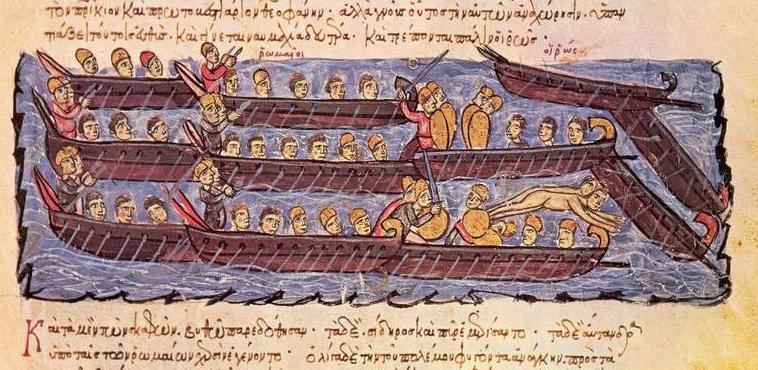
The Byzantine fleet under Theophanes repels the Rus' in 941. Miniature from the Madrid Skylitzes.

In 943 Kourkouas invaded northern Mesopotamia and besieged the important city of Edessa in 944. As the price for his withdrawal, Kourkouas obtained one of Byzantium's most prized relics, the mandylion, the holy towel allegedly sent by Jesus Christ to King Abgar V of Edessa.

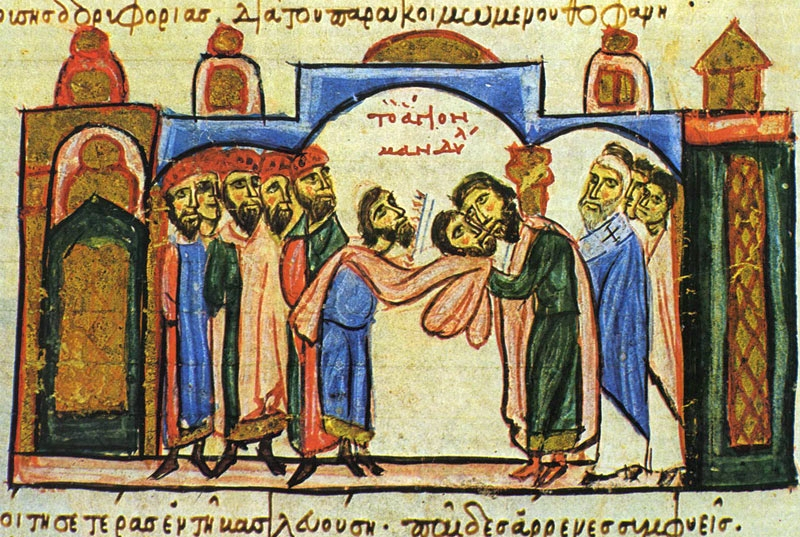
In exchange for sparing Edessa, its inhabitants gift the Mandylion to the Byzantines.

John Kourkouas, although considered by some of his contemporaries "a second Trajan or Belisarius," was dismissed after the fall of the Lekapenoi in 945. Nevertheless, his campaigns in the East paved the way for the even more dramatic reconquests in the middle and the second half of the 10th century.

== Internal policies ==
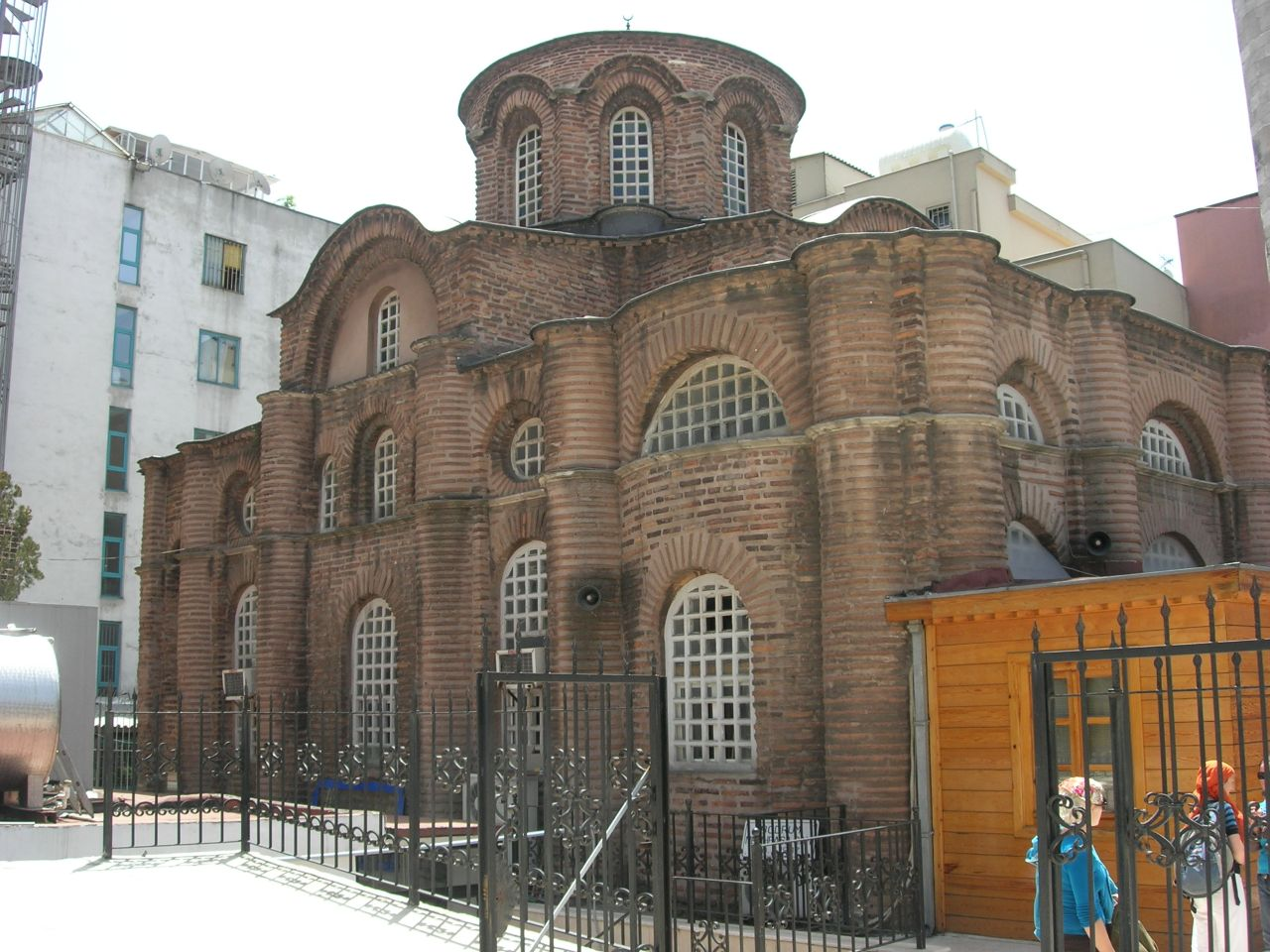
The palace church at Myrelaion, commissioned by Romanos I as a family shrine in 922 in Constantinople.

Romanos I Lekapenos attempted to strengthen the Byzantine Empire by seeking peace everywhere that it was possible—his dealings with Bulgaria and Kievan Rus' have been described above. To protect Byzantine Thrace from Magyar incursions (such as the ones in 934 and 943), Romanos paid them protection money and pursued diplomatic avenues. The Khazars were the allies of the Byzantines until the reign of Romanos, when he started persecuting the Jews of the empire. According to the Schechter Letter, the Khazar ruler Joseph responded to the persecution of Jews by "doing away with many Christians", and Romanos retaliated by inciting Oleg of Novgorod (called Helgu in the letter) against Khazaria.

Similarly, Romanos re-established peace within the church and overcame the new conflict between Rome and Constantinople by promulgating the Tomos of Union in 920. In 933 Romanos took advantage of a vacancy on the patriarchal throne to name his young son Theophylaktos patriarch of Constantinople. The new patriarch did not achieve renown for his piety and spirituality, but he added theatrical elements to the Byzantine liturgy and was an avid horse-breeder, allegedly leaving mass to tend to one of his favorite mares when she was giving birth.

Romanos was active as a legislator, promulgating a series of laws to protect small landowners from being swallowed up by the estates of the land-owning nobility (dynatoi). The legislative reform may have been partly inspired by hardship caused by the famine of 927 and the subsequent semi-popular revolt of Basil the Copper Hand. The emperor also managed to increase the taxes levied on the aristocracy and established the state on a more secure financial footing. Romanos was also able to effectively subdue revolts in several provinces of the empire, most notably in Chaldia, the Peloponnese, and Southern Italy.

He incorporated the Armenian fortress of Citharizum into the empire in 942 and renamed it Romanopolis (Ρωμανούπολις). In Constantinople, he built his palace in the place called Myrelaion, near the Sea of Marmara. Beside it Romanos built a shrine which became the first example of a private burial church of a Byzantine emperor. Moreover, he erected a chapel devoted to Christ Chalkites near the Chalke Gate, the monumental entrance to the Great Palace.

== End of the reign ==
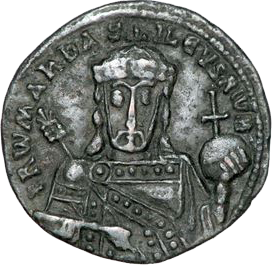
Follis of Romanos I, marked: "RωMAN(ός) BASILЄVS RωM(αῖων)"

Romanos' later reign was marked by the old emperor's heightened interest in divine judgment and his increasing sense of guilt for his role in the usurpation of the throne from Constantine VII. On the death of Christopher, by far his most competent son, in 931, Romanos did not advance his younger sons in precedence over Constantine VII. Fearing that Romanos would allow Constantine VII to succeed him instead of them, his younger sons Stephen and Constantine arrested their father on 20 (or 16) December 944, carried him off to the Princes' Islands and compelled him to become a monk. When they threatened the position of Constantine VII, however, the people of Constantinople revolted, and Stephen and Constantine were likewise stripped of their imperial rank and sent into exile to their father. Romanos died on 15 June 948, and was buried as the other members of his family in the church of Myrelaion.

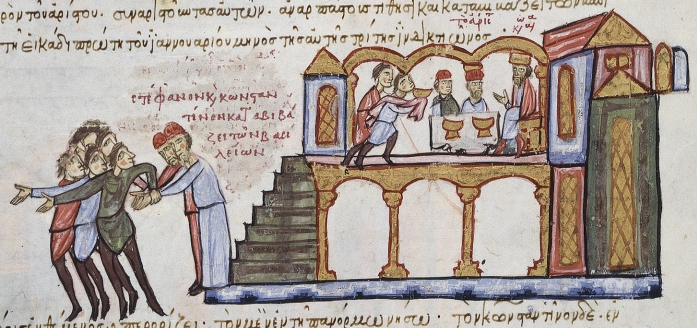
Stephanos and Constantine are deposed during lunch with Constantine VII and exiled to a monastery.

Having lived long under constant threat of deposition—or worse—by the Lekapenoi family, Constantine VII was extremely resentful of them. In his De Administrando Imperio manual written for his son and successor, Romanos II, he minces no words about his late father-in-law: "the lord Romanus the Emperor was an idiot and an illiterate man, neither bred in the high imperial manner, nor following Roman custom from the beginning, nor of imperial or noble descent, and therefore the more rude and authoritarian in doing most things ... for his beliefs were uncouth, obstinate, ignorant of what is good, and unwilling to adhere to what is right and proper."

== Family ==
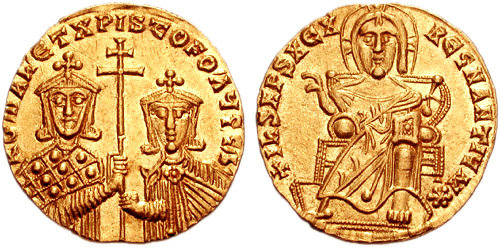
Gold solidus of Romanos I with his eldest son, Christopher Lekapenos

Romanos I's only named wife is Theodora, who died in 922. However, genealogical and chronological considerations have led to the hypothesis that his three eldest children may have been born from an otherwise unattested first marriage. Romanos had at least eight legitimate and at least one illegitimate children, leading to numerous aristocratic descendants and connections in the Middle Byzantine period, including every emperor for the next century.

- Christopher, co-emperor from 921 to 931 (foremost co-emperor from 927); he married the augusta Sophia (died after 944), daughter of the magistros and patrikios Niketas Helladikos; they were parents of:
  - Maria (renamed Eirene, "Peace"), died before 967 (963?); she married 927 Emperor Peter I of Bulgaria; they were parents, among others, of:
    - Boris II, emperor of Bulgaria, died 977; he married and left issue
    - Roman, emperor of Bulgaria, died 997
  - Romanos, crowned co-emperor around 924, died in childhood before 927. Only briefly mentioned by Michael Psellos and Joannes Zonaras.
  - Michael Porphyrogennetos, born after 921, possibly given quasi-imperial honors before 945, subsequently magistros and raiktor, died after 963; he married and was the father of:
    - Helene; she married Konstantinos Radenos, protospatharios; left issue
    - Sophia; she married Pankratios Taronites, patrikios; left issue
- unnamed daughter, who died after 961; she married Romanos Saronites, magistros; they were the parents of two unnamed children
- unnamed daughter; she married (Alexios?) Mousele, who died in 922; they were the parents of:
  - Romanos Mousele, magistros; left issue
- Theophylaktos, born 913, castrated as child, patriarch of Constantinople from 933 to 956.
- Stephen Porphyrogennetos, born c. 920, co-emperor from 923 to 945, died 963; he married (in 934?) Anna, daughter of Gabalas; they were the parents of:
  - Romanos, sebastophoros, logothete of the envoys, castrated 945, died 975
- Constantine Porphyrogennetos, born c. 921, co-emperor from 923 to 945, died between 945 and 948; he married (1) Helena, daughter of the patrikios Adrianos, and (2), 941? Theophano Mamas; he and his first wife were the parents of:
  - Romanos, patrikios and praipositos, born after 934, castrated 945, died 971
- Helena, b. c. 907, died 961; she married Emperor Constantine VII; they were the parents of:
  - Leo, born before 939, died 944 or 945
  - Emperor Romanos II, born 937–939, died 963; he married (1) 944 Bertha (renamed Eudokia), daughter of Hugh of Provence, king of Italy, died 949; (2) c. 956 Anastaso (renamed Theophano), daughter of Krateros, died after 978; they were the parents of:
    - Emperor Basil II, born 958, died 1025
    - Emperor Constantine VIII, born 960 or 961, died 1028; he married c. 976 Helena, daughter of Alypios, died c. 989; they were the parents of:
      - Eudokia, nun
      - Empress Zoe, born c. 978, died 1050; she married (1) 1028 Emperor Romanos III Argyros, died 1034; (2) 1034 Emperor Michael IV, died 1041; (3) 1042 Emperor Constantine IX Monomachos, died 1055; no issue, but adopted Emperor Michael V
      - Empress Theodora, born c. 980 (or 989?), died 1056
    - Anna, born 963, died 1011; she married 989 Vladimir I of Rus'; they were the parents of:
      - Feofana; she married Ostromir, posadnik of Novgorod, died c. 1057; left issue
  - Zoe, nun since 959
  - Theodora, nun 959; married 970 Emperor John I Tzimiskes, died 976
  - Agatha, nun 959
  - Theophano, nun 959
  - Anna, nun 959
- Agatha, born c. 908?; she married in 921-922 Romanos Argyros; they were the parents of:
  - (Marianos?) Argyros; he married and was the father of:
    - Emperor Romanos III Argyros, died 1034; he married (1) Helena, nun 1028; (2) the Empress Zoe, died 1050
    - Basil Argyros, called Mesardonites, protospatharios, patrikios, katepano, died 1034; married and was the father of:
      - unnamed Argyros
      - unnamed Argyre; she married Constantine Diogenes, protospatharios, katepano, doux, died 1032; they were the parents of:
        - Emperor Romanos IV Diogenes, died 1072; he married (1) unnamed daughter of Alusian of Bulgaria; (2) in 1068 Eudokia Makrembolitissa; they were the parents of:
          - Constantine Diogenes, by the first marriage, died c. 1074; he married Theodora Komnene, sister of Emperor Alexios I Komnenos
          - Leo Diogenes, by the second marriage, born c. 1069, died 1087
          - Nikephoros Diogenes, by the second marriage, born c. 1070, died after 1094
      - Helena Argyre; she married after 1028 King Bagrat IV of Georgia; no issue
      - unnamed Argyre; she married King Hovhannes-Smbat III of Armenia
    - Leon Argyros, katepano, killed 1017
    - Maria Argyre, died 1006 or 1007; she married Giovanni Orseolo, son of Doge Pietro II Orseolo; they were the parents of:
      - Basilio Orseolo, died 1006 or 1007
    - Pulcheria Argyre, born c. 965, died c. 1034; she married Basil Skleros, patrikios, magistros; they were the parents of:
      - unnamed Skleraina, died before 1042; she married the future Emperor Constantine IX Monomachos, who died 1055
- Basil, illegitimate son by a "Scythian" mistress, eunuch, protobestiarios, parakoimomenos, paradynasteuon, proedros, who remained influential at court, dominating it in 976–985, before being set aside; he died after 986.

== See also ==
- List of Byzantine emperors

== Sources ==
- Kaldellis, Anthony, Streams of Gold, Rivers of Blood: The rise and fall of Byzantium, 955 A.D. to the First Crusade, Oxford, 2017.
- Kazhdan, Alexander, ed. (1991). "Romanos I Lekapenos". The Oxford Dictionary of Byzantium. Oxford and New York: Oxford University Press. p. 1806. ISBN 0-19-504652-8.
- Lilie, Ralph-Johannes; et al. (2013). "Romanos I. Lekapenos (#26833)". Prosopography of the Byzantine World. doi:10.1515/pmbz.
- Poppe, Andrzej, "Feofana Novgorodskaja," Novgorodskij istoričeskij sbornik 6 (1997) 102–120.
- Runciman, Steven (1988) [1929]. The Emperor Romanus Lecapenus and His Reign: A Study of Tenth-Century Byzantium. Cambridge, United Kingdom: Cambridge University Press. ISBN 0-521-35722-5.
- Shepard, Jonathan (2003), "Marriages towards the Millennium," in P. Magdalino (ed.), Byzantium in the Year 1000, Leiden, pp. 1–34.

Romanos I Lekapenos Macedonian dynasty Born: c. 870 Died: 15 June 948
Regnal titles
Preceded by Constantine VII	Byzantine emperor 920–944 with Constantine VII (913–959); Christopher Lekapenos (921–931); Stephen Lekapenos (924–945); Constantine Lekapenos (924–945)	Succeeded by Constantine VII
