= Eudokia (daughter of Constantine VIII) =

Eldest daughter of the Byzantine emperor

Eudokia Porphyrogenita (Greek: Ευδοκία Πορφυρογέννητη, romanized: Evdokía Porphyrogénnētē; c. 976/7 - after 1001) was the eldest daughter of the Byzantine Emperor Constantine VIII and Helena Alypia, and part of the last generation of the Macedonian dynasty along with her younger sisters Zoe and Theodora.

Her uncle Basil II was the senior Emperor until his death in 1025, and did not allow his nieces to marry Byzantine aristocrats to avoid giving their would-be husbands a claim to the throne. Accordingly, Eudokia, like her sisters, lived in relative obscurity in the imperial gynaeceum. According to Michael Psellos, at some point in her youth, Eudokia contracted an infectious illness that disfigured her face, and subsequently became a nun. The exact timing of these events is unclear, but in 1001 Eudokia was rejected as a potential bride for the Holy Roman Emperor Otto III in favor of Zoe, on account of her disfigurement. Nothing further is recorded about her.

== Possible marriage and descendants ==
Ronald Wells, a modern genealogist, has suggested that Eudokia did not remain a nun for life. He has theorised an identification of Eudokia with the otherwise unnamed wife of Andronikos Doukas - a Paphlagonian nobleman who may have served as governor of the theme of Moesia - making Eudokia the mother of Constantine X and Caesar John Doukas.

Wells has further suggested two daughters of the above proposed union. The first suggested daughter is Maria, the wife of Ivan Vladislav. Christian Settipani has however posited a more robustly argued descent of Maria from Boris II of Bulgaria. The second daughter is "Sophia", an alleged wife of Manuel Erotikos Komnenos. Manuel was the father of Isaac I Komnenos and John Komnenos, the latter being the father of Alexios I Komnenos.

The claim, which provides no references or argumentation, apparently serves as a way to trace the ancestry of the Doukas and Komnenos families to the Macedonian dynasty. There is however no proof for any such relationship of Eudokia in primary sources or contemporary sigillography and modern historical and prosopographical authorities remain equally silent on the matter, making the asserted descent appear entirely unlikely.

== Sources ==
- Cheynet, Jean-Claude, Pouvoir et Contestations a Byzance (963-1210), Paris: Publications de la Sorbonne, 1996.
- Settipani, Christian, Continuité des élites à Byzance durant les siècles obscurs. Les princes caucasiens et l'Empire du VIe au IXe siècle, Paris: De Boccard, 2006.
- Norwich, John Julius (1993). Byzantium #2 The Apogee. London: Penguin. ISBN 978-0-14-011448-5.
