= Born in the purple =

Title granted to Byzantine (and later other) princes

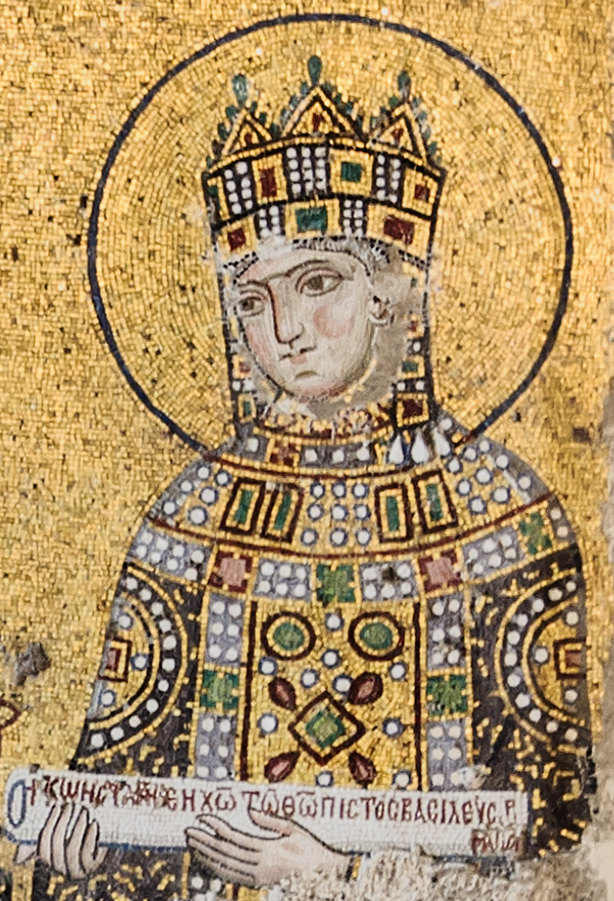
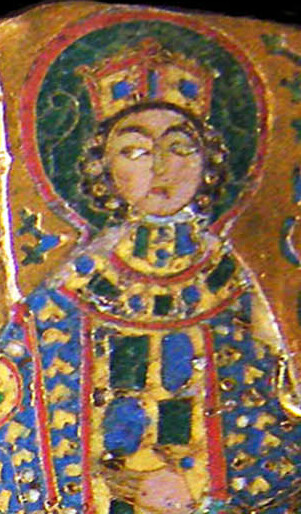
Zoë Porphyrogenita (left) and Theodora Porphyrogenita (right), two sisters who co-ruled as Byzantine empresses regnant near the end of the Macedonian dynasty.

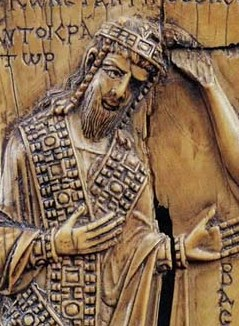
The Byzantine emperor Constantine VII Porphyrogenitus in a 945 carved ivory

Traditionally, born in the purple (sometimes "born to the purple") was a category of members of royal families born during the reign of their parent. This notion was later loosely expanded to include all children born of prominent or high-ranking parents. The parents must be prominent at the time of the child's birth so that the child is always in the spotlight and destined for a prominent role in life. A child born before their parents became prominent would not be "born in the purple". This color purple came to refer to Tyrian purple, restricted by law, custom, and the expense of creating it to royalty.

Porphyrogénnētos (Greek: Πορφυρογέννητος, lit. 'purple-born'), Latinized as Porphyrogenitus, was an honorific title in the Byzantine Empire given to a son, or daughter (Πορφυρογέννητη, Porphyrogénnētē, Latinized Porphyrogenita), born after the father had become emperor.

Both imperial or Tyrian purple, a dye for cloth, and the purple stone porphyry were rare and expensive, and at times reserved for imperial use only. In particular there was a room in the imperial Great Palace of Constantinople entirely lined with porphyry, where reigning empresses gave birth.

== Porphyrogeniture ==
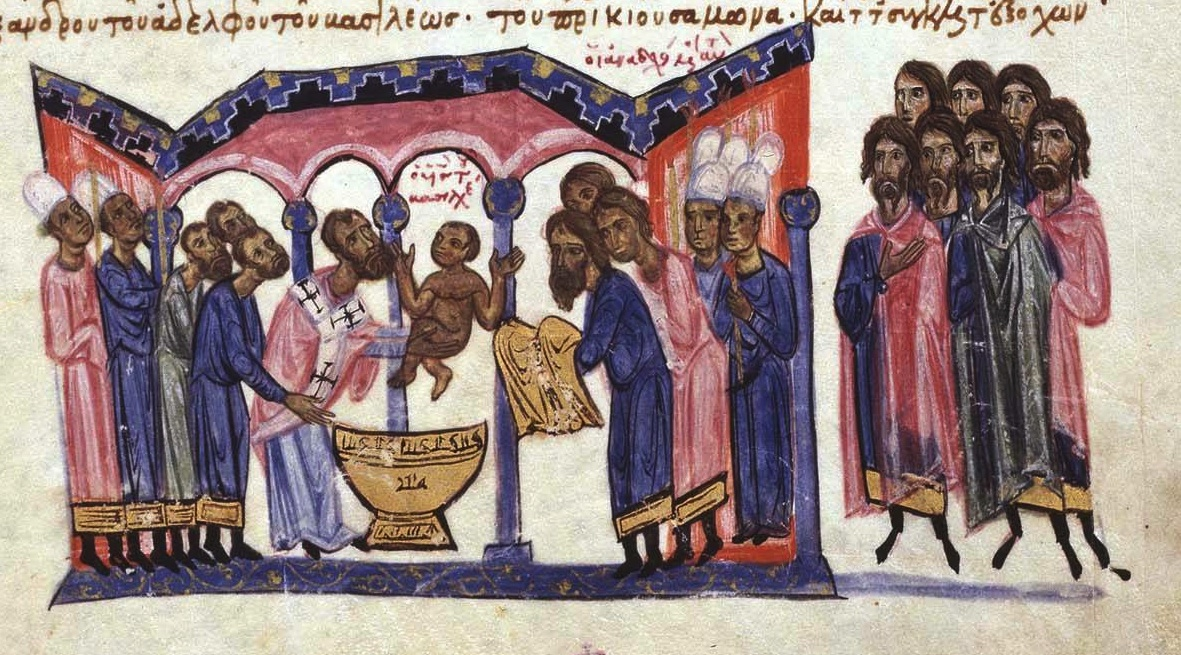
Patriarch Nicholas Mystikos baptizes Constantine VII Porphyrogennetos

Porphyrogeniture is a system of political succession that favours the rights of sons born after their father has become king or emperor, over older siblings born before their father's ascent to the throne.

Examples of this practice include Byzantium and the Western European model. In late 11th century England and Normandy, the theory of porphyrogeniture was used by Henry I of England to justify why he, and not his older brother Robert Curthose, should inherit the throne after the death of their brother William Rufus.

The concept of porphyrogénnētos (literally meaning "born in the purple") was known from the sixth century in connection with growing ideas of hereditary legitimacy, but the first secure use of the word is not found until 846. The term became common by the 10th century, particularly in connection with Emperor Constantine VII Porphyrogennetos (r. 913–959), and its use continued into the Palaiologan period. Constantine VII described the ceremonies which took place during the birth of a porphyrogénnētos boy in his work De Ceremoniis aulae byzantinae.

=== Etymology ===
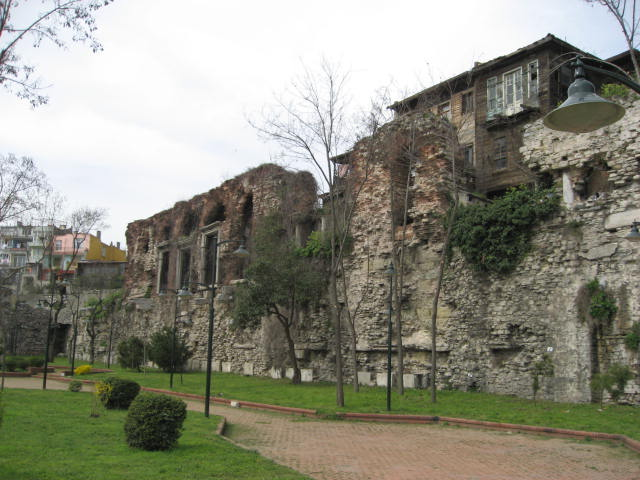
The Boukoleon Palace as it survives today

The Byzantines themselves ascribed it either to the fact that the child was born to parents bearing the imperial purple, or because the child was born in a special porphyry chamber in the Great Palace of Constantinople. As the porphyrogennētē 12th-century princess Anna Komnene described it, the room, "set apart long ago for an empress's confinement", was located "where the stone oxen and the lions stand" (i.e. the Boukoleon Palace), and was in the form of a perfect square from floor to ceiling, with the latter ending in a pyramid. Its walls, floor and ceiling were completely veneered with imperial porphyry, which was "generally of a purple colour throughout, but with white spots like sand sprinkled over it." However, both explanations were current already in the 10th century.

Imperial purple was a luxury dye obtained from sea snails, used to colour cloth. Its production was extremely expensive, so the dye was used as a status symbol by the Ancient Romans, e.g. a purple stripe on the togas of Roman magistrates and the all-purple toga picta worn in triumphs. By the Byzantine period, the colour had become associated with the emperors, and sumptuary laws restricted its use by anyone except the imperial household. Purple was thus seen as an imperial colour.

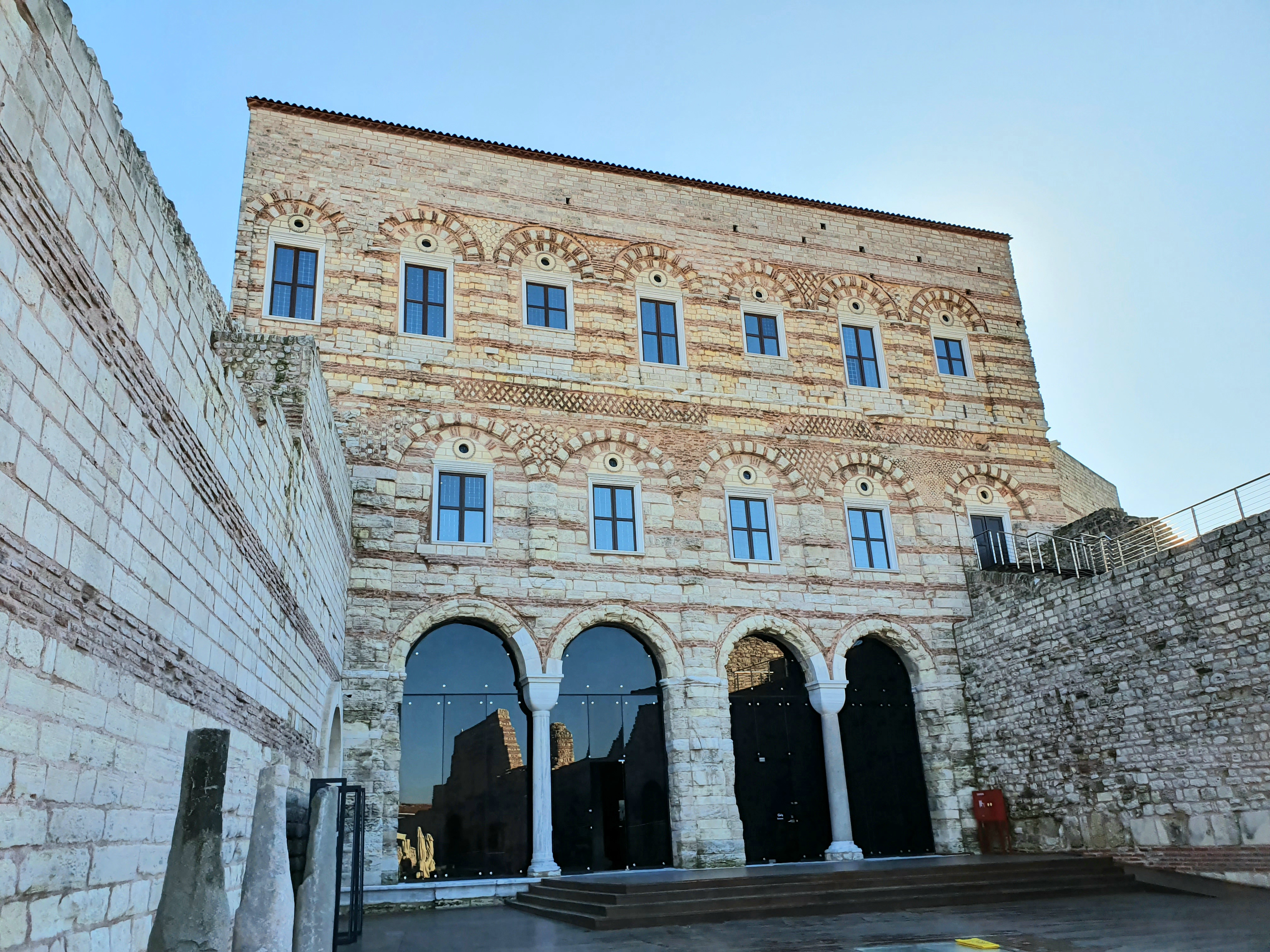
The northern façade of the Palace of the Porphyrogenitus after the modern renovation

The Palace of the Porphyrogenitus is a late 13th-century Byzantine palace in the north-western part of the old city of Constantinople named after Constantine Palaiologos, a younger son of Emperor Michael VIII.

=== Diplomacy ===
In Imperial diplomacy a porphyrogénnēta bride was sometimes sent to seal a bargain, or a foreign princess may have gone to Constantinople to marry a porphyrogénnētos. Liutprand of Cremona, for instance, visited Constantinople in 968 on a diplomatic mission from Otto I to secure a purple-born bride for the prince who would eventually become Otto II, in which mission he failed. A different bride who was not purple-born, Theophanu, was subsequently acquired in 971.

== Limitations ==
In modern parlance, to be "born in the purple" is often seen as a limitation to be escaped rather than a benefit or a blessing. Rarely, the term refers to someone born with immense talent that shapes their career and forces them into paths they might not otherwise wish to follow. An obituary of the British composer Hubert Parry complains that his immense natural talent (described as being "born in the purple") forced him to take on teaching and administrative duties that prevented him from composing in the manner that might have been allowed to someone who had to develop their talent.

In this sense, the parents' prominence predetermines the child's role in life. A royal child, for instance, is denied the opportunity to an ordinary life because of their parents' royal rank. An example of this usage can be seen in the following discussion comparing the German Kaiser Wilhelm II with his grandfather, Wilhelm I, and his father, Frederick III:

Compare this with his grandfather, the old Emperor, who, if he had not been born in the purple, could only have been a soldier, and not, it must be added, one who could have held very high commands. Compare him again with his father; the Emperor Frederick, if he had not been born in the purple, though he certainly showed greater military capacity than the old Emperor, nevertheless would probably not have been happy or successful in any private station other than that of a great moral teacher.

The classic definition restricted use of the category specifically to the legitimate offspring born to reigning monarchs after they ascended to the throne. It did not include children born prior to their parents' accession or, in an extremely strict definition, their coronation.

== List of Porphyrogennetoi ==
=== Byzantine Empire ===
Name	Birth	Title	Father	Mother
Leo VI the Wise		Emperor and Autocrat of the Romans (870 – 912)	Basil I (r. 866 – 886)	Eudokia Ingerina
Stephen I of Constantinople	867	Archbishop of Constantinople, the New Rome (886 – 893)	Basil I (r. 866 – 886)	Eudokia Ingerina
Alexander	870	Emperor and Autocrat of the Romans (879 – 913)	Basil I (r. 866 – 886)	Eudokia Ingerina
Constantine VII Porphyrogennetos	905	Emperor and Autocrat of the Romans (908 – 959)	Leo VI the Wise (r. 870 – 912)	Zoe Karbonopsina
Romanos II	938	Emperor and Autocrat of the Romans (945 – 963)	Constantine VII (r. 908 – 959)	Helena Lekapene
Basil II	958	Emperor and Autocrat of the Romans (960 – 1025)	Romanos II (r. 945 – 963)	Theophano
Constantine VIII	960	Emperor and Autocrat of the Romans (962 – 1028)	Romanos II (r. 945 – 963)	Theophano
Anna Porphyrogenita	963	Grand Princess consort of Kiev (989 – c. 1011)	Romanos II (r. 945 – 963)	Theophano
Zoe Porphyrogenita	c. 978	Augusta (1028 – 1050) Empress and Autocratess of the Romans (1042)	Constantine VIII (r. 962 – 1028)	Helena
Theodora Porphyrogenita	c. 980	Augusta (1042 – 1056) Empress and Autocratess of the Romans (1042, 1055 – 1056)	Constantine VIII (r. 962 – 1028)	Helena
Konstantios Doukas	1060	Emperor and Autocrat of the Romans (1060 – 1078)	Constantine X Doukas (1059 – 1067)	Eudokia Makrembolitissa
Leo & Nikephoros Diogenes	c. 1069	Emperors and Autocrats of the Romans (1070 – 1071)	Romanos IV Diogenes (1068 – 1071)	Eudokia Makrembolitissa
Constantine Doukas	c. 1074	Emperor and Autocrat of the Romans (1074 – 1078, 1081 – 1087)	Michael VII Doukas (r. c. 1060 – 1078)	Maria of Alania
Anna Komnene	1083	Kaisarissa (c. 1104 – 1153)	Alexios I Komnenos (r. 1081 – 1118)	Irene Doukaina
Maria Komnene	1085	Panhypersebaste (1099/1100 – 1136)	Alexios I Komnenos (r. 1081 – 1118)	Irene Doukaina
John II Komnenos	1087	Emperor and Autocrat of the Romans (1092 – 1143)	Alexios I Komnenos (r. 1081 – 1118)	Irene Doukaina
Andronikos Komnenos	1091	Sebastokrator (1102/4 – 1130/1)	Alexios I Komnenos (r. 1081 – 1118)	Irene Doukaina
Isaac Komnenos	1093	Sebastokrator (1118 – c. 1152	Alexios I Komnenos (r. 1081 – 1118)	Irene Doukaina
Eudokia Komnene	1094		Alexios I Komnenos (r. 1081 – 1118)	Irene Doukaina
Theodora Komnene	1096	Sebastohypertate (c. 1122 – after 1136	Alexios I Komnenos (r. 1081 – 1118)	Irene Doukaina
Manuel Komnenos	1097		Alexios I Komnenos (r. 1081 – 1118)	Irene Doukaina
Zoe Komnene	1098		Alexios I Komnenos (r. 1081 – 1118)	Irene Doukaina
Alexios Komnenos	1106	Emperor of the Romans (1119 – 1142)	John II Komnenos (r. 1092 – 1143	Irene of Hungary
Andronikos Komnenos	c. 1108	Sebastokrator (1122 – 1142)	John II Komnenos (r. 1092 – 1143	Irene of Hungary
Isaac Komnenos	c. 1113	Sebastokrator (1122 – after 1146)	John II Komnenos (r. 1092 – 1143	Irene of Hungary
Manuel I Komnenos	1118	Emperor and Autocrat of the Romans (1143 – 1180)	John II Komnenos (r. 1092 – 1143	Irene of Hungary
Maria Komnene	1152	Kaisarissa (1180 – 1182)	Manuel I Komnenos (r. 1143 – 1180)	Bertha of Sulzbach
Alexios II Komnenos	1169	Emperor and Autocrat of the Romans (1171 – 1183)	Manuel I Komnenos (r. 1143 – 1180)	Maria of Antioch
Theodore II Doukas Laskaris	1221/2	Emperor and Autocrat of the Romans (1235 – 1258)	John III Doukas Vatatzes (r. 1221 – 1254)	Irene Laskarina
Constantine Palaiologos	1261		Michael VIII Palaiologos (r. 1259 – 1282)	Theodora Palaiologina
Eudokia Palaiologina	c. 1265	Empress of Trebizond (1282 – 1298)	Michael VIII Palaiologos (r. 1259 – 1282)	Theodora Palaiologina
Constantine Palaiologos	1278/81	Despot (1294 – 1322)	Andronikos II Palaiologos (r. c. 1265 – 1328)	Anna of Hungary
Theodore I of Montferrat	c. 1290	Marquis of Montferrat (1306 – 1338)	Andronikos II Palaiologos (r. c. 1265 – 1328)	Irene of Montferrat
Anna Anachoutlou	c. 1300	Empress and Autocratess of all the East and Perateia (1341 – 1342)	Alexios III of Trebizond (r. 1297 – 1330)	Jiajak Jaqeli
Michael Palaiologos	1337	Despot (1341 – 1352)	Andronikos III Palaiologos (r. 1308/13 – 1341)	Anna of Savoy
Manuel II Palaiologos	1350	Emperor and Autocrat of the Romans (1373 – 1425)	John V Palaiologos (r. 1341 – 1391)	Helena Kantakouzene
Theodore I Palaiologos	1355	Despot (1376 – 1407)	John V Palaiologos (r. 1341 – 1391)	Helena Kantakouzene
Theodore II Palaiologos	c. 1396	Despot (1407 – 1448)	Manuel II Palaiologos (r. 1373 – 1425)	Helena Dragaš
Constantine XI Palaiologos	1404	Emperor and Autocrat of the Romans (1448 – 1453)	Manuel II Palaiologos (r. 1373 – 1425)	Helena Dragaš
Demetrios Palaiologos	1407	Despot (1430 – 1460)	Manuel II Palaiologos (r. 1373 – 1425)	Helena Dragaš
Thomas Palaiologos	1409	Despot (1430 – 1465)	Manuel II Palaiologos (r. 1373 – 1425)	Helena Dragaš
Andreas Palaiologos	1453	Despot (1465 – 1502) Emperor and Autocrat of the Romans (1483 – 1494, 1498 – 1502)	Thomas Palaiologos (r. 1430 – 1465)	Catherine Zaccaria

=== Latin Empire ===
Name	Birth	Title	Father	Mother
Baldwin II	c. 1217	Emperor and Autocrat of the Romans (1228 – 1273)	Peter II of Courtenay (r. 1217)	Yolanda of Flanders (r. 1217–1219)
Philip I of Courtenay	1243	Emperor and Autocrat of the Romans (1273 – 1282)	Baldwin II (1228 – 1273)	Marie of Brienne

== See also ==
- Crown prince
- Divine right of kings
- Dynasty
- Nepotism
- Royal and noble styles
- Royal prerogative
- Silver spoon
- Son of a nobody
