= Zoe Porphyrogenita =

Byzantine empress regnant in 1042

- Augusta; Empress and Autocratess of the Romans
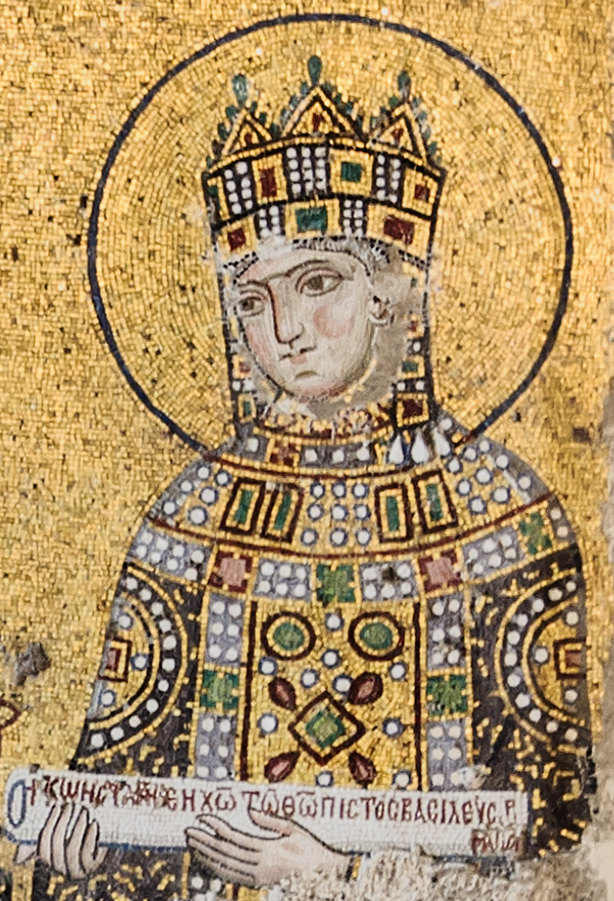
- Contemporary mosaic of Zoe presenting a scroll to Jesus Christ, at Hagia Sophia: a caption (not shown) reads, "Zoe, the most pious Augusta"

Byzantine empress regnant
- Reign: 21 April 1042 – 11 June 1042
- Coronation: 21 April 1042
- Predecessor: Michael V
- Successor: Constantine IX
- Co-sovereign: Theodora (as junior empress) (Note: Zoe and Theodora reigned together in 1042, but Zoe was the senior empress while Theodora was the junior empress.)

Byzantine empress consort
- Tenure: 1028–1041, 1042–1050

Augusta of the Byzantine Empire
- Reign: 1028–1050
- Emperors: See list: Romanos III (1028–1034); Michael IV (1034–1041); Michael V (1041–1042); Constantine IX (1042–1050)
- Born: c. 978; Constantinople (now Istanbul, Turkey)
- Died: 1050 (aged 72); Constantinople
- Burial: Chapel of Christ Antiphonites, Constantinople
- Spouses: Romanos III (1028–1034); Michael IV (1034–1041); Constantine IX (1042–1050)
- Dynasty: Macedonian
- Father: Constantine VIII
- Mother: Helena

Zoe Porphyrogenita (also spelled Zoë; Greek: Ζωή Πορφυρογέννητη, romanized: Zōē Porphyrogénnētē, Medieval Greek: [zoˈi] "life"; c. 978 – 1050) was a member of the Macedonian dynasty who briefly reigned as Byzantine empress regnant in 1042, alongside her sister Theodora. Before that she was enthroned as Augusta to a series of co-rulers, two of whom were married to her.

Zoe was born when her father Constantine was nominal co-emperor to his brother, Basil II. After a planned marriage to Holy Roman Emperor Otto III in 996 failed to materialise, Zoe spent subsequent years in the imperial palace. Her uncle Basil died in 1025 when Zoe was 47, and her father acceded the Byzantine throne as Constantine VIII. As he had no sons, Constantine hoped to continue the dynasty by marrying off one of his daughters. Zoe, aged 50, was married to Romanos Argyros. She and Romanos took the throne the next day on her father's death.

Zoe's marriage to Romanos III was troubled, and Romanos was found dead in his bath in 1034. His death has been variously attributed to Zoe, her lover Michael, or both. Zoe and Michael were married on the same day as the supposed murder, and he was crowned Emperor Michael IV on the following day. In 1041, Zoe was persuaded to adopt her dying husband's nephew, Michael Kalaphates. After Michael V became emperor, he exiled Zoe. This action sparked a popular revolt which dethroned him and installed Zoe and her sister Theodora as joint empresses. After a two-month joint reign, Zoe married a former lover who was installed as Constantine IX, transferring power to him. However, she continued to rule the empire as its heir and as Augusta. Eight years later, Zoe died aged 72.

== Early life: c. 978–1028 ==
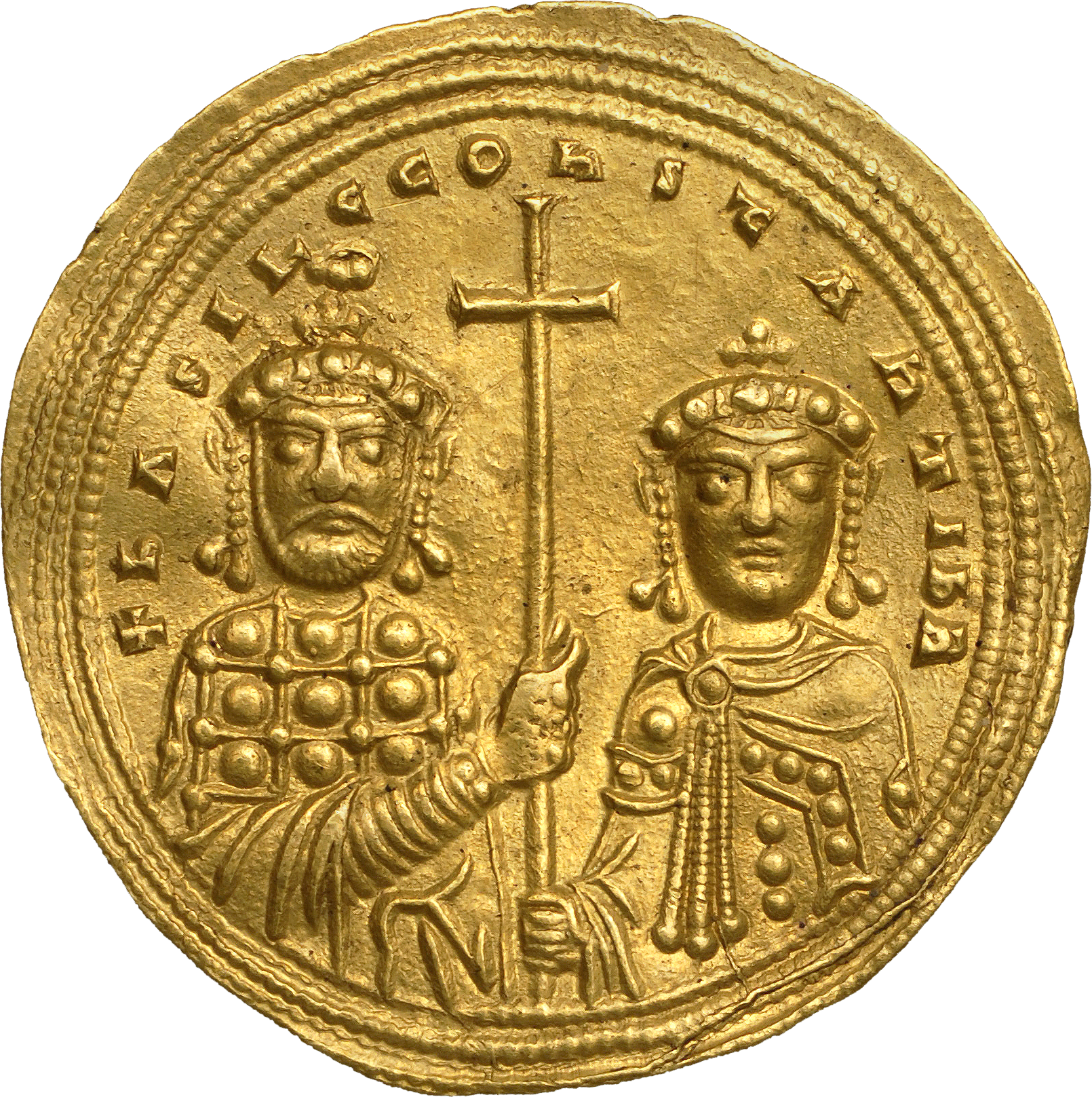
Histamenon depicting Basil II and Constantine VIII, holding a cross

Zoe was Porphyrogenita, "born into the purple"; this was the appellation for a child born in the capital to a reigning emperor. She was the second daughter of Constantine VIII and his wife Helena. Her father had become co-emperor, at the age of two, in 962. His brother Basil II, the senior co-ruler, prevented his nieces from marrying any of the Byzantine nobility, as this would have given their husbands a claim on the imperial throne. As women they were unable to exercise any state authority; their only say in this was in choosing, or more likely accepting or not, a husband who would acquire their authority upon marriage. Consequently, Zoe lived a life of virtual obscurity in the imperial gynaeceum (women's quarters) for many years.

As an eligible imperial princess Zoe was considered a possible bride for the Holy Roman Emperor, Otto III, in 996. A second embassy sent in 1001, headed by Arnulf II, Archbishop of Milan, was tasked with selecting Otto's bride from among Constantine's three daughters. The eldest, Eudokia, was disfigured by smallpox, while the youngest, Theodora, was a very plain girl. Arnulf, therefore, selected the attractive 23-year-old Zoe, to which Basil II agreed. In January 1002 she accompanied Arnulf back to Italy, only to discover when the ship reached Bari that Otto had died, forcing her to return home.

When Basil II died, Constantine VIII took the throne. His reign as sole emperor lasted less than three years, from 15 December 1025 to 11 November 1028. Another opportunity for Zoe to marry arose in 1028 when an embassy from the Holy Roman Empire arrived in Constantinople with a proposal for an imperial marriage. Constantine and Zoe rejected the idea out of hand when it was revealed that the intended groom, Henry, the son of Conrad II, was only ten years old. Constantine determined that the ruling house would be continued by one of his daughters being married to an appropriate aristocrat. The first potential match was the distinguished noble Constantine Dalassenos, the former dux of Antioch. The emperor's advisors preferred a weak ruler whom they could control and they persuaded him to reject Dalassenos after he had already been summoned to the capital. Romanos Argyros, the urban prefect of Constantinople, was the next to be considered as a match. Theodora defied her father by refusing to marry Romanos, arguing that he was already married – his wife having been forced to become a nun to allow Romanos to marry into the imperial family – and that as third cousins they had too close a blood relationship for marriage to occur. Consequently, Constantine VIII chose Zoe to be Romanos's wife. Zoe and Romanos married on 10 November 1028 in the imperial chapel of the palace. The next day Constantine died and the newlyweds were seated on the imperial throne.

== From Romanos III to Michael V: 1028–1042 ==
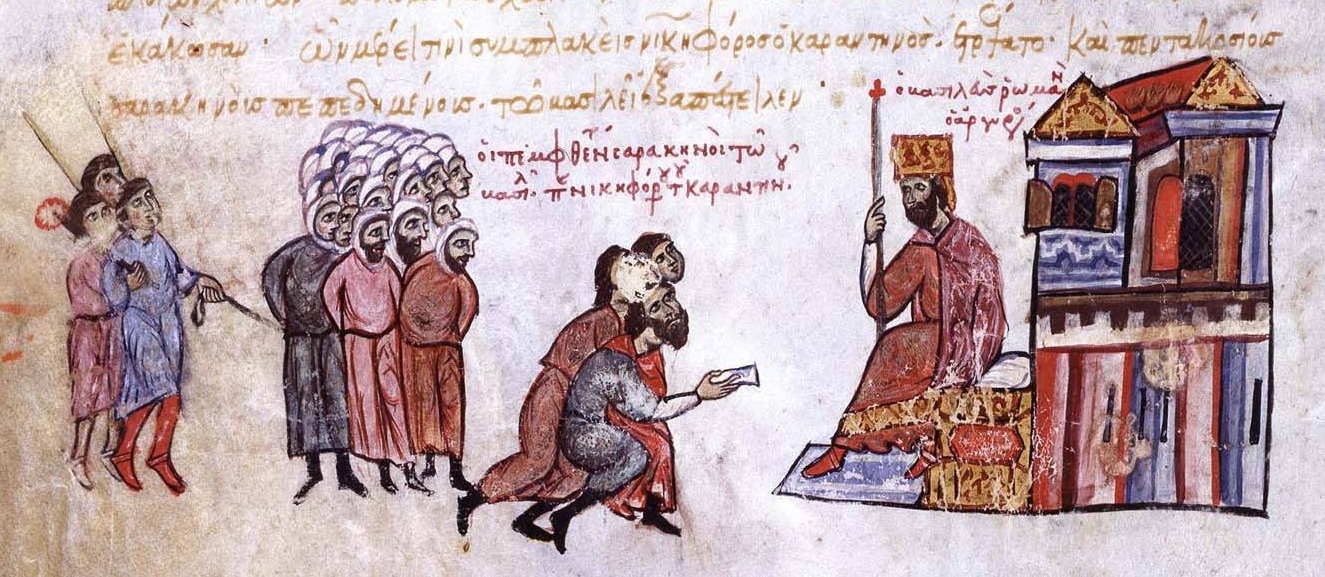
Arab captives, taken after the victory of Nikephoros Karantenos over an Arab fleet, are brought before Emperor Romanos III.

Spending years in the same restrictive quarters with her sister, Zoe had come to loathe Theodora. Zoe convinced Romanos to appoint one of his own men as the chief of Theodora's household, with orders to spy on her. Shortly afterwards, Theodora was accused of plotting to usurp the throne, first with Presian in 1030, followed by Constantine Diogenes, the governor of Sirmium, in 1031. Zoe accused her of being part of the conspiracy, and Theodora was forcibly confined in the monastery of Petrion. Zoe later visited her sister and forced her to take religious vows.

Zoe was obsessed with continuing the Macedonian dynasty. Almost immediately upon marrying Romanos the fifty-year-old Zoe tried desperately to become pregnant. She used magic charms, amulets, and potions, all without effect. This failure to conceive helped alienate the couple, and soon Romanos refused to share the marriage bed with her. Romanos limited his wife's spending and paid her little attention.

Zoe, furious and frustrated, engaged in a number of affairs. Romanos tolerated these and took a mistress himself. In 1033 Zoe became enamoured of a low-born servant called Michael. She flaunted her lover openly and spoke about making him emperor. Rumours of her conduct led Romanos to confront Michael, who denied aspiring to the throne.

In early 1034 Romanos became ill and it was widely believed that Zoe and Michael were conspiring to have him poisoned. On 11 April Romanos was found dying in his bath. According to court official and later chronicler Michael Psellus some of his retinue had "held his head for a long time beneath the water, attempting at the same time to strangle him". John Scylitzes writes as a simple fact that Romanos was drowned on Michael's orders. Matthew of Edessa's account has Zoe poisoning Romanos.

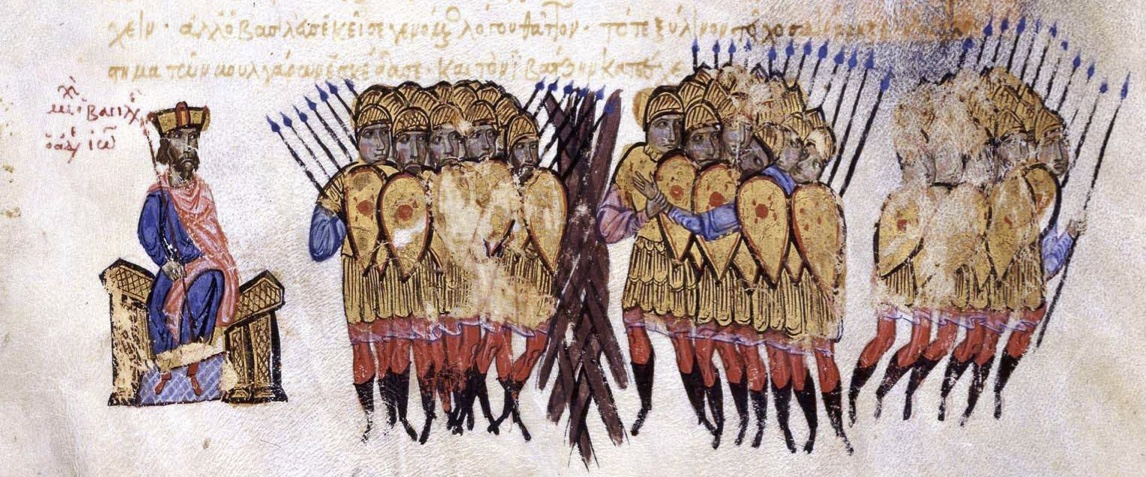
Michael IV and his men in front of the Bulgarian barricade

Zoe and Michael were married on the same day that Romanos III died. The next day they summoned the Patriarch Alexios I to officiate at the coronation of the new emperor. Although he initially refused to co-operate, the payment of 50 pounds of gold helped change his mind. Zoe's new husband took power as Michael IV. His abrupt rise to power had left him unprepared to rule, and he delegated much of the business of governing to his brother, the eunuch John the Orphanotrophos.

Although Zoe believed Michael would prove to be a more devoted husband than Romanos, she was mistaken. Fearing that Zoe would turn on him as she had turned on his predecessor, Michael excluded her from politics and sent her back to the gynaeceum, where she was kept under strict surveillance. The disgruntled empress tried to alter the balance of power by conspiring against John, without success.

Michael's health was bad throughout his reign, and by 1041 it was obvious that he was dying. Eager to ensure that power remained in his hands, John the Eunuch forced Zoe to adopt his nephew Michael Kalaphates. On 10 December 1041, Michael IV died, refusing to the last to see his wife who begged that she be allowed to visit him one more time. Kalaphates was crowned emperor as Michael V.

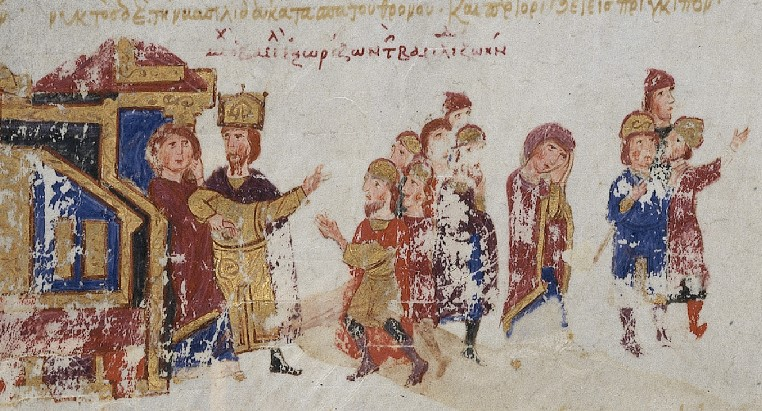
Zoe departing for Principus, banished by Michael V

Although he had pledged to respect Zoe, Michael V eventually banished her to a monastery on Principus, an island in the Sea of Marmara, on charges of attempted regicide. She was forcibly tonsured and sworn into a religious order. This treatment of the legitimate heir to the Macedonian Dynasty caused a popular uprising in Constantinople. Michael V, desperate to keep his throne, brought Zoe back from Principus and displayed her to the people, but his insistence that he continue to rule alongside her was in vain. On 19 April 1042, the mob revolted against Michael V in support of not only Zoe but also Theodora.

A delegation headed by Patrician Constantine Cabasilas went to the monastery at Petrion to convince Theodora to become co-empress alongside her sister. Theodora had become accustomed to a life of religious contemplation and tried to refuse the proposal, but the delegates brought her forcibly back to the capital. At an assembly in Hagia Sophia the people escorted a furious Theodora and proclaimed her empress along with Zoe. They were both crowned on 21 April and Michael V was forced to take refuge in a monastery.

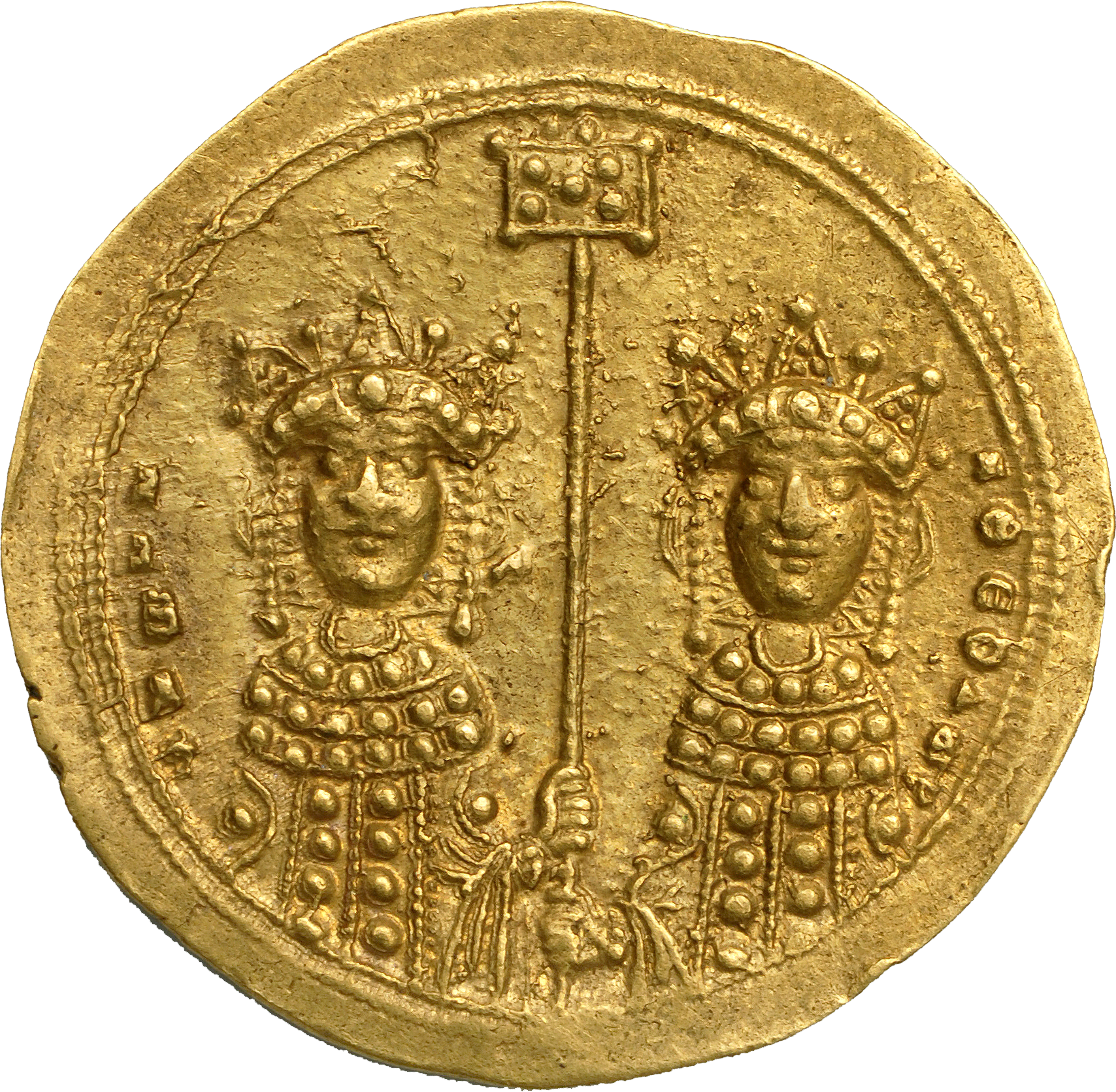
Gold histamenon of Zoe and Theodora, dating from their joint reign in 1042

== Ruling with Theodora and Constantine IX: 1042–1050 ==
Zoe immediately assumed power and tried to force Theodora back to her monastery, but the Senate and the people demanded that the sisters should jointly reign. As her first act, Theodora was called upon to deal with Michael V. Zoe wanted to pardon and free Michael, but Theodora was clear and adamant. She initially guaranteed Michael's safety, but then ordered him to be blinded and to spend the rest of his life as a monk.

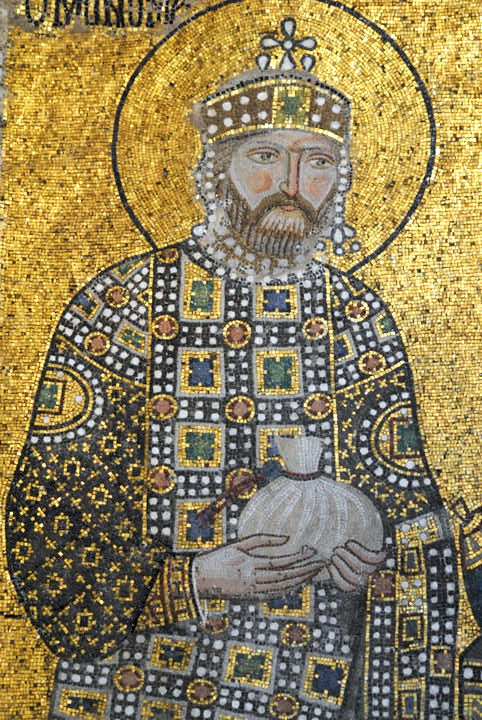
A Hagia Sophia mosaic of Constantine IX

Officially Zoe was the senior empress, and her throne was situated slightly in front of Theodora's on all public occasions. In practice, Theodora was the driving force behind the joint administration. The sisters proceeded to administer the empire, focusing on curbing the sale of public offices and on the administration of justice. Although contemporary historian Michael Psellus claimed the joint reign was a complete failure, John Scylitzes stated that they were very conscientious in rectifying the abuses of the previous reigns.

Theodora and Zoe appeared together at meetings of the Senate and gave public audiences, but it was soon apparent that their joint reign was under strain. Zoe was still jealous of Theodora and had no desire to administer the empire; but she would not allow Theodora to conduct public business alone. The court began to split, with factions forming behind each empress. After two months of increasing acrimony, Zoe decided to search for a new husband – thereby denying Theodora the opportunity to increase her influence. By the rules of the Orthodox Church her next marriage, her third, was the last she was permitted.

Her preference was for Constantine Dalassenos, who had been her father's first choice as her husband back in 1028. He was brought for an audience before the Empress, but during their conversation his independent and forceful manner displeased Zoe, and he was dismissed from her presence. Her next choice was the married Constantine Atroklines, a court official with whom it was rumoured that she had had an affair during the reign of Romanos III. He died under mysterious circumstances a few days before the wedding was to take place, possibly poisoned by his own soon to be ex-wife.

Zoe then remembered the handsome and urbane Constantine Monomachos, another former lover. The pair were married on 11 June 1042, without the participation of Patriarch Alexios, who refused to officiate over a third marriage (for both spouses). Constantine was crowned by the patriarch the next day. The coinage of Zoe and Theodora came to an end as soon as Zoe married Constantine IX, because the empress-consort and junior co-emperor's association on the coins depended on the senior emperor's pleasure.

Zoe got more than she bargained for when Constantine decided to bring with him to his new station his long-standing mistress Maria Skleraina. Not content with bringing her to court, he insisted that he be allowed to publicly share his life with her, and that she obtain some official recognition. The 64-year-old Zoe did not object to sharing her bed and her throne with Skleraina. Skleraina was given the title of sebaste, ranking behind Zoe and Theodora, and was addressed as mistress or empress, like them. At official events Skleraina took position immediately behind the sisters.

In the eyes of the public, however, Constantine IX's preferential treatment of Skleraina was a scandal, and eventually rumours began to spread that Skleraina was planning to murder Zoe, and possibly Theodora. This led to a popular uprising by the citizens of Constantinople in 1044, which came dangerously close to actually harming Constantine, who was participating in a religious procession along the streets of Constantinople. The mob was only quieted by the appearance on a balcony of Zoe and Theodora, who reassured the people that they were not in any danger of assassination.

It is said that Zoe was stunningly beautiful, and Michael Psellos in his Chronographia commented that "every part of her was firm and in good condition". Recognising her own beauty and its use as a tool of statecraft, Zoe attempted to maximise and prolong its effect with a variety of treatments. She operated a cosmetics laboratory in the gynaeceum, and was said to have carried out experiments to improve the efficacy of the perfumes and unguents prepared there. Psellos reports that her face looked youthful into her sixties.

Psellos noted changes in Zoe's personality in her later years; she became deeply pious, and kept a bejeweled statue of Christ in her quarters that she would consult for omens, often passing them on to Constantine. He also claims that she became more extravagant and indolent, and that she developed vindictive tendencies and would order people to be blinded for trivial offenses or none at all, which often compelled Emperor Constantine to intercede on behalf of those condemned.

Zoe died in 1050, aged 72. She was buried in Constantinople. Constantine attempted to have Zoe canonised as a saint, but his efforts foundered on her history of affairs.

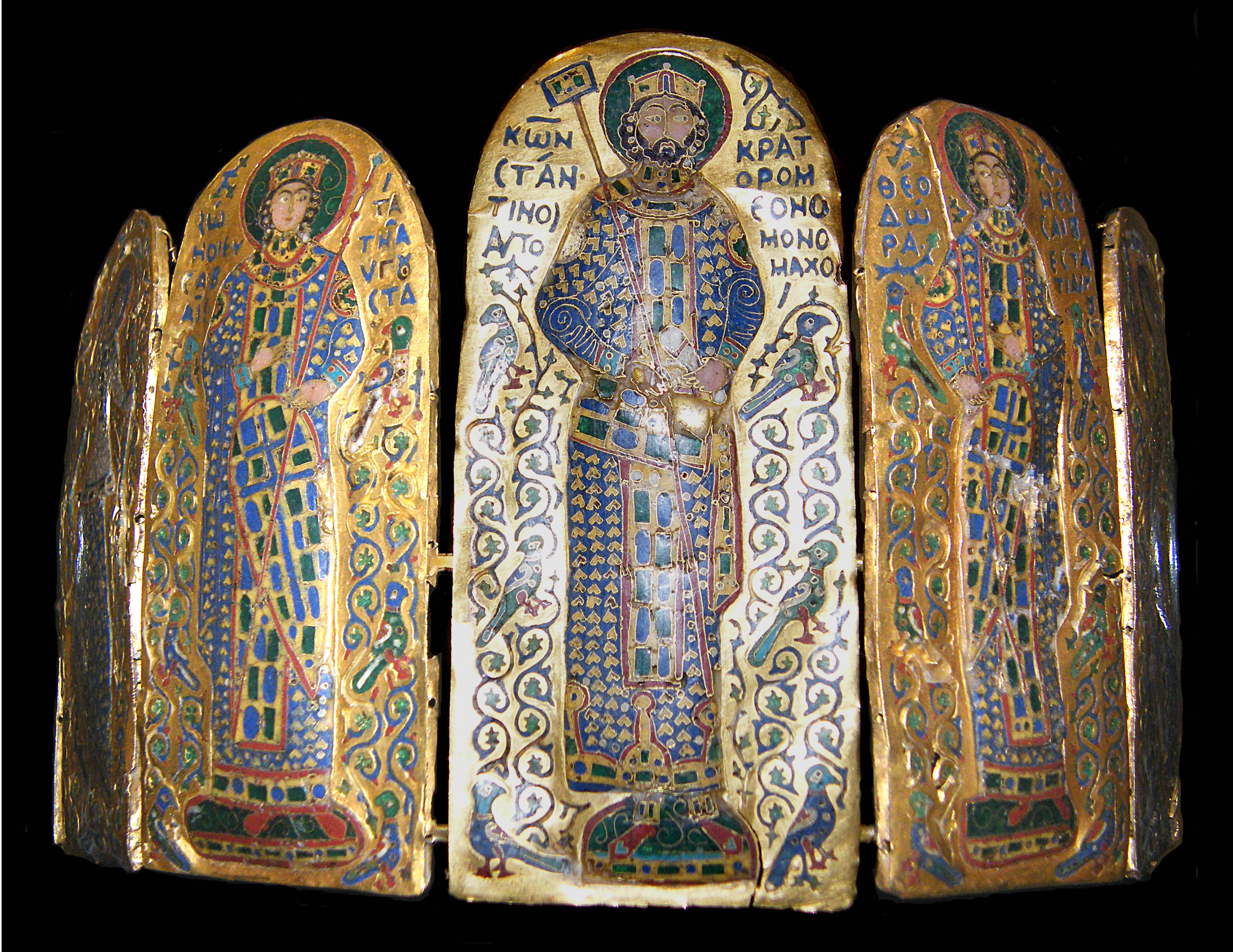
Zoë (left), Constantine IX (centre), and Theodora (right) depicted on the Monomachus Crown

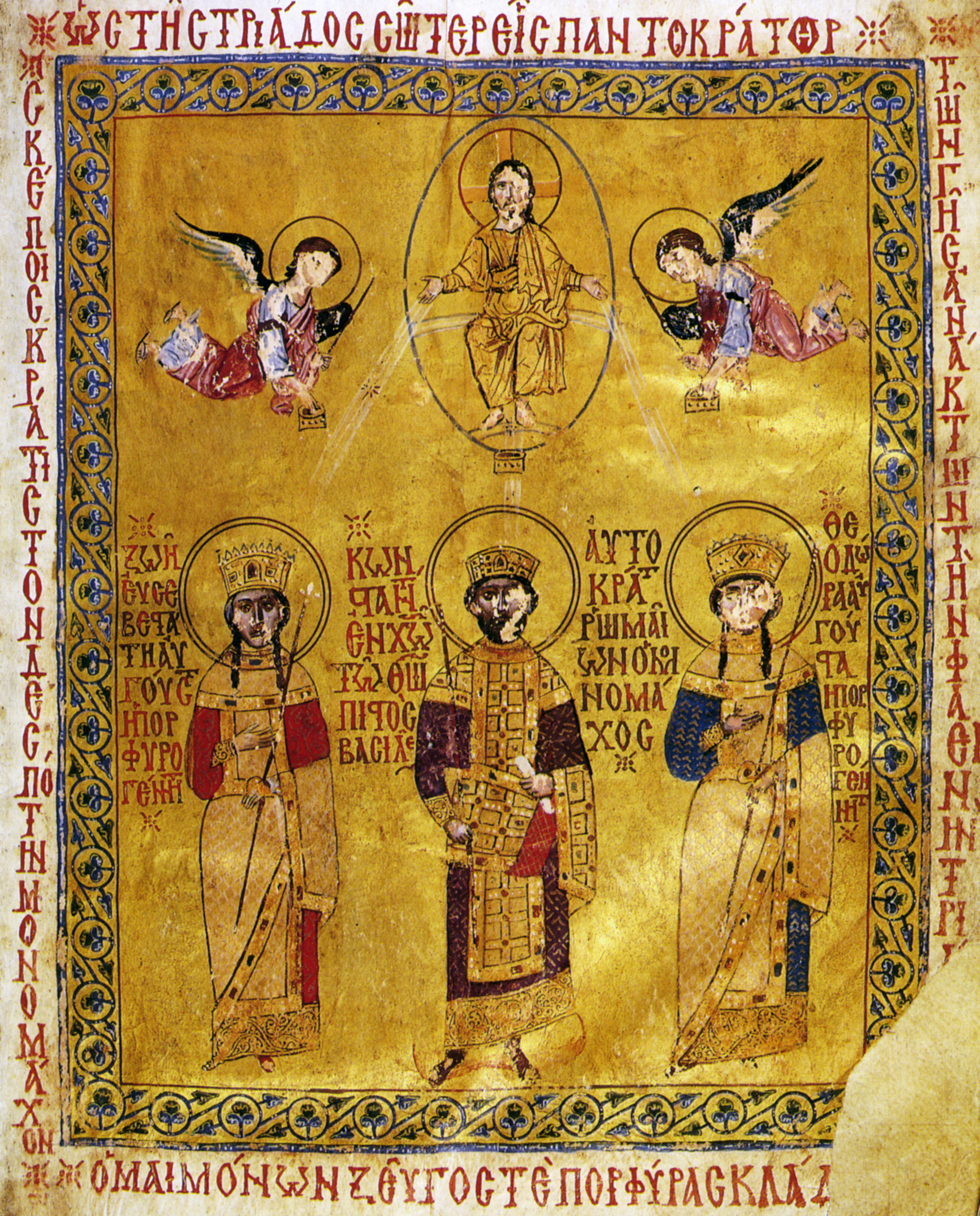
Miniature with the portraits of Zoë (left), Constantine IX (center) and Theodora (right).

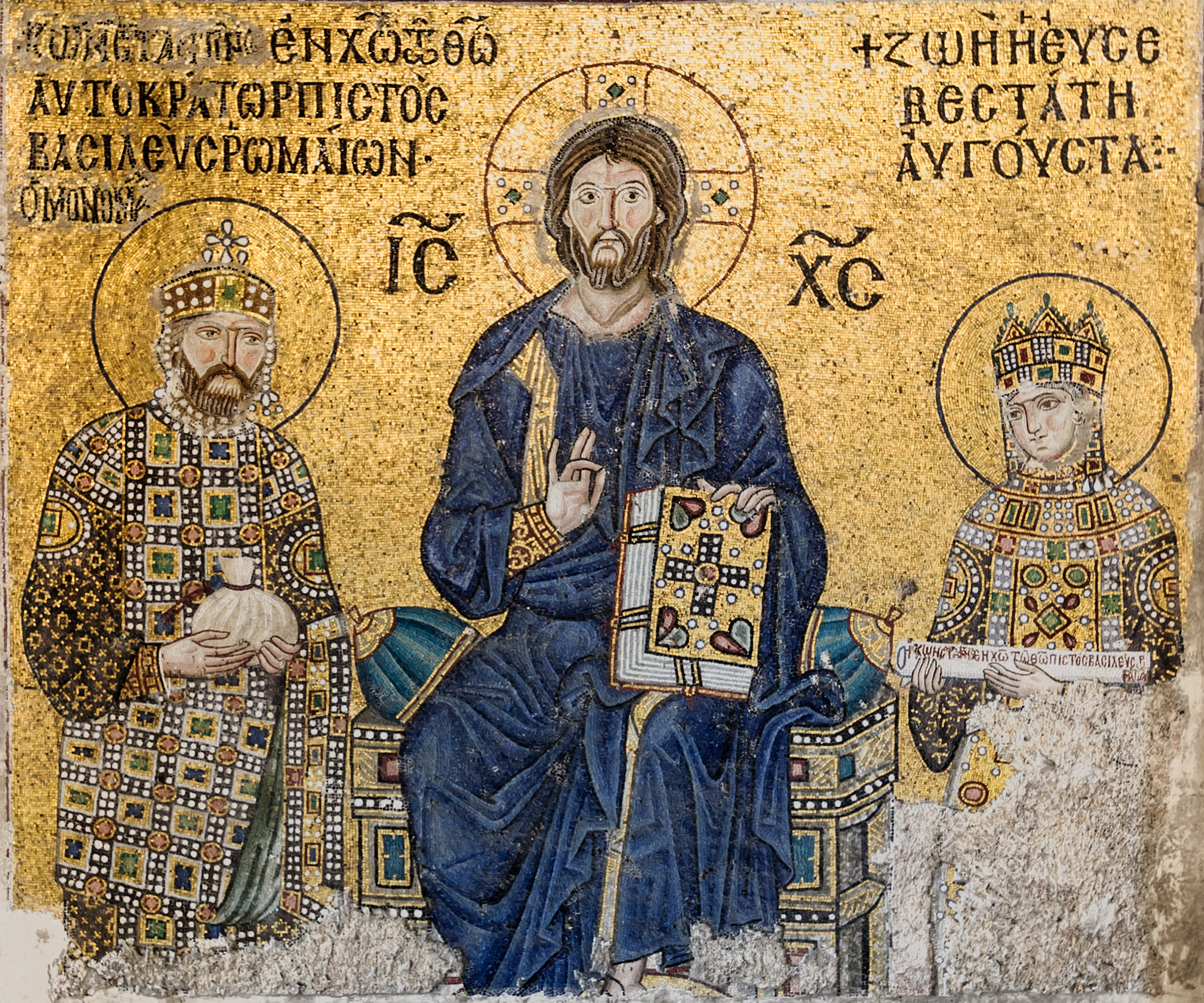
Hagia Sophia mosaic of a seated Christ Pantocrator, with Zoë standing to the right and Constantine IX standing to the left

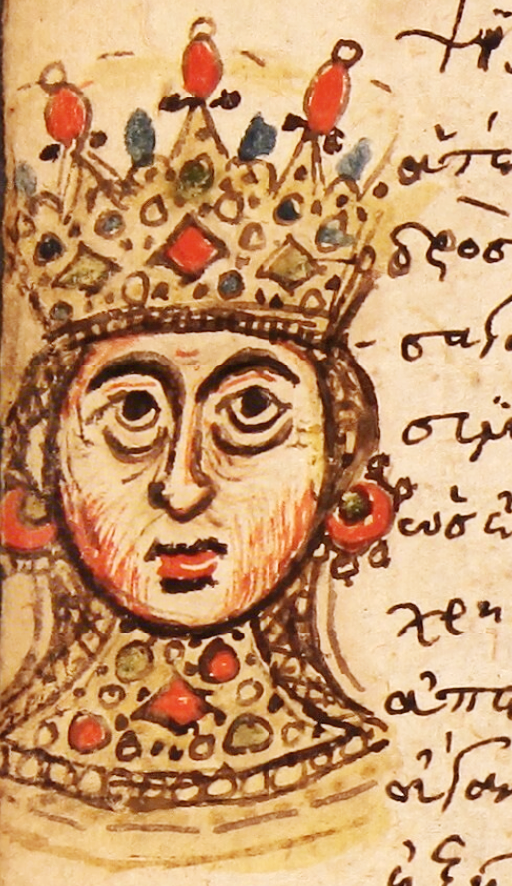
15th-century portrait of Zoë in the Mutinensis gr. 122

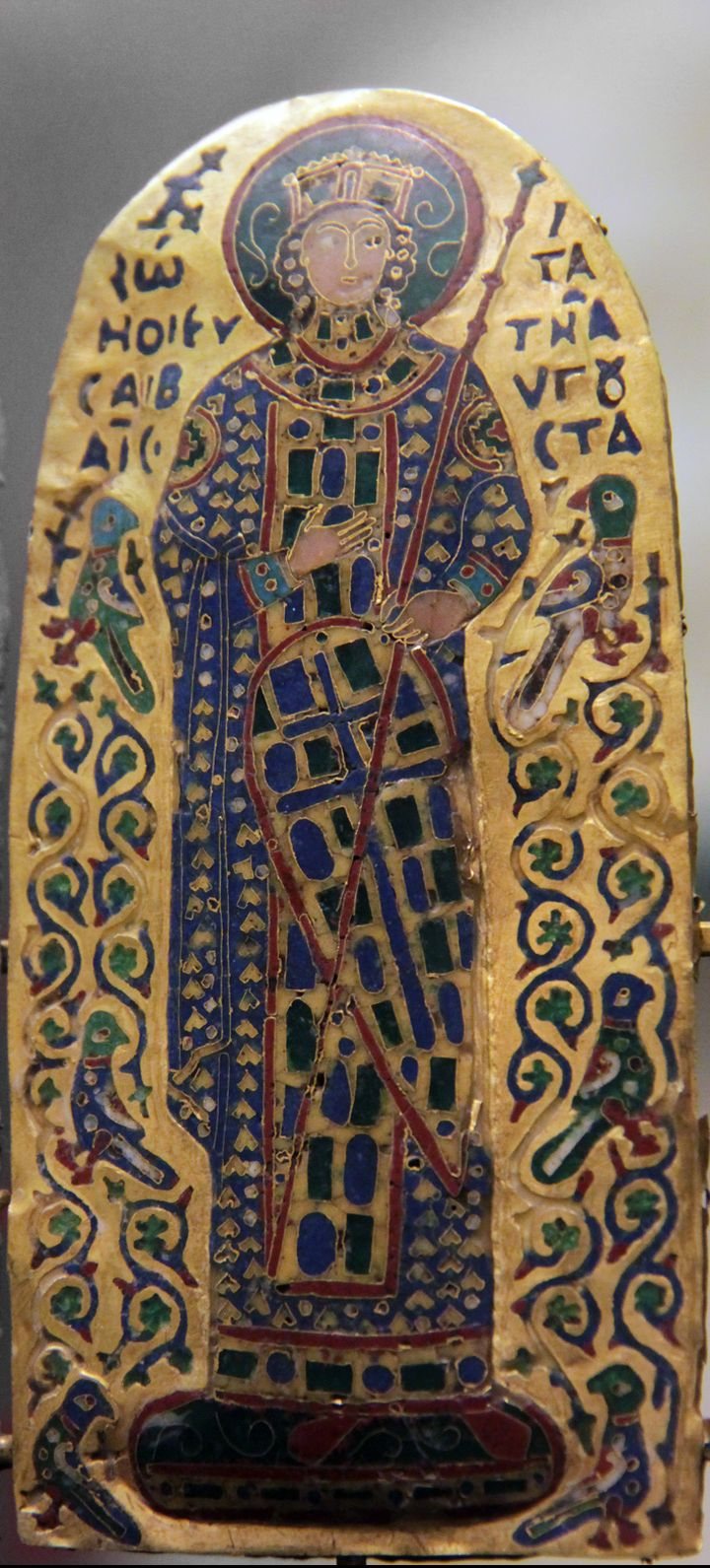
Zoe, depicted on the Monomachus Crown

== See also ==
- List of Byzantine emperors

== Sources ==
=== Primary sources ===
- Michael Psellus (c. 1080). Chronographia.
  - Michael Psellus (1953). Chronographia [English translation]. Translated by E. R. A. Sewter. London.
- Thurn, Hans, ed. (1973). Ioannis Scylitzae Synopsis historiarum. Berlin-New York: De Gruyter. ISBN 978-3-11-002285-8.

=== Secondary sources ===
- Canduci, Alexander (2010). Triumph & Tragedy: The Rise and Fall of Rome's Immortal Emperors. Millers Point, N.S.W.: Pier 9. ISBN 978-1-74196-598-8.
- Finlay, George (1853). History of the Byzantine Empire from 716–1057. William Blackwood & Sons.
- Garland, Lynda (2006). "Zoe Porphyrogenita (wife of Romanus III, Constantine IX, and Michael IV)". De Imperatoribus Romanis.
- Kazhdan, Alexander, ed. (1991). The Oxford Dictionary of Byzantium. Oxford and New York: Oxford University Press. ISBN 0-19-504652-8.
- Norwich, John Julius (1993). Byzantium #2 The Apogee. London: Penguin. ISBN 978-0-14-011448-5.
- Ostrogorsky, George (1957). History of The Byzantine State. New Brunswick: Rutgers University Press. OCLC 422217218.
- Panas, Marios; Poulakou-Rebelakou, Effie; Kalfakis, Nicoalos; Vassilopoulos, Dimitrios (September 2012). "The Byzantine Empress Zoe Porphyrogenita and the quest for eternal youth". Journal of Cosmetic Dermatology. 11 (3): 245–248. doi:10.1111/j.1473-2165.2012.00629.x. PMID 22938012. S2CID 25156633.
- Sherrard, Philip (1966). Byzantium. Time-Life Books.
- Treadgold, Warren T. (1997), A History of the Byzantine State and Society, Stanford, CA: Stanford University Press, ISBN 978-0-8047-2630-6
- Garland, Lynda (1999). Byzantine Empresses: Women and Power in Byzantium, AD 527–1204. London & New York: Routledge. ISBN 978-0-415-14688-3.

Zoe Porphyrogenita Macedonian dynasty Born: c. 978 Died: June 1050
Regnal titles
Preceded by Michael V	Byzantine Empress; 1042 with Theodora	Succeeded by Constantine IX
Royal titles
Preceded by Helena	Byzantine Empress consort 1028–1041, 1042–1050	Succeeded by Catherine of Bulgaria
