= Constantine VIII =

Byzantine emperor from 962 to 1028

- Emperor and Autocrat of the Romans
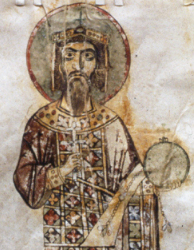
- Contemporary miniature of Constantine VIII, from a Bari Exultet roll

Byzantine emperor
- Reign: 15 December 1025 – 11 November 1028 (Note: Co-Emperor with Romanos II (962–963), Nikephoros II Phokas (963–969), John I Tzimiskes (969–976) and Basil II (962–1025))
- Coronation: 30 March 962
- Predecessor: Basil II
- Successor: Romanos III (by marrying Augusta Zoe)
- Born: 960
- Died: 11/12 November 1028 (aged 67–68)
- Spouse: Helena
- Issue: Eudokia; Zoe; Theodora
- Dynasty: Macedonian dynasty
- Father: Romanos II
- Mother: Theophano

Constantine VIII (Greek: Κωνσταντῖνος, romanized: Kōnstantīnos; (Note: Also called Porphyrogenitus (Greek: Πορφυρογέννητος, romanized: Porphyrogénnētos), although the epithet is almost exclusively used for Constantine VII.) 960 – 11/12 November 1028) was de jure Byzantine emperor from 962 until his death. He was the younger son of Emperor Romanos II and Empress Theophano. He was nominal co-emperor from 962, successively with his father; his stepfather, Nikephoros II Phokas; his uncle, John I Tzimiskes; and his brother, Basil II. Basil's death in 1025 left Constantine as the sole emperor. He occupied the throne for 66 years in total, making him de jure the longest-reigning amongst all Roman emperors since Augustus.

Constantine displayed a lifelong lack of interest in politics, statecraft and the military, and during his brief sole reign the government of the Byzantine Empire suffered from mismanagement and neglect. He had no sons and was instead succeeded by Romanos Argyros, husband of his daughter Zoe.

== Family ==
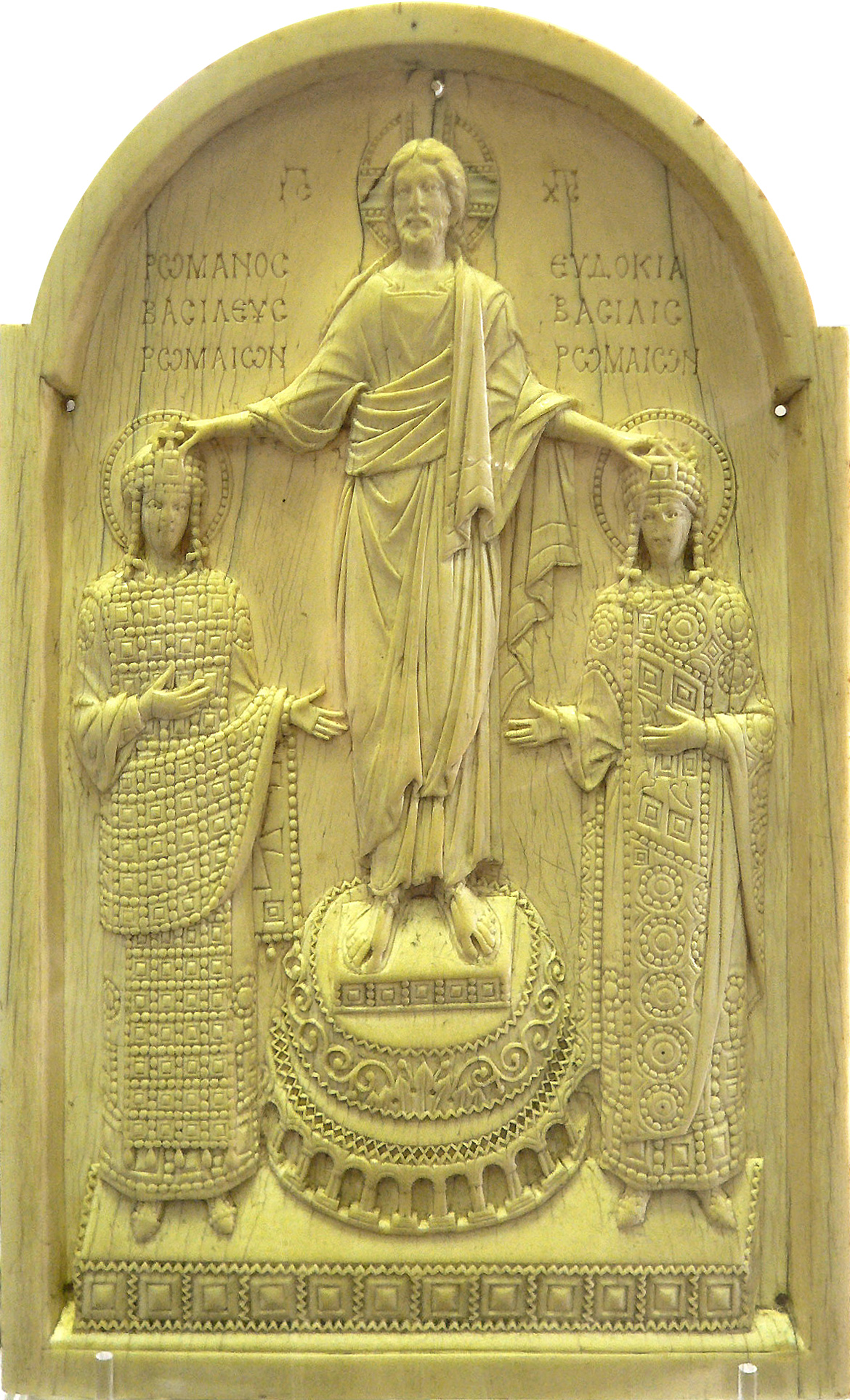
Constantine VIII's father (left) in the Romanos Ivory

Constantine was born in 960, two years after his brother Basil. Their parents were Romanos II, the sixth Byzantine emperor of the Macedonian dynasty, and his second wife Theophano, an innkeeper's daughter described by contemporaries as ambitious and amoral. Aged eight, Constantine was engaged to a daughter of Emperor Boris II of Bulgaria but in the end, he married a Byzantine aristocrat, Helena, daughter of Alypius. Of their three daughters, Eudokia became a nun after contracting smallpox, Zoe was empress for 22 years, and Theodora reigned for 18 months as the last monarch of the Macedonian line.

== Life ==
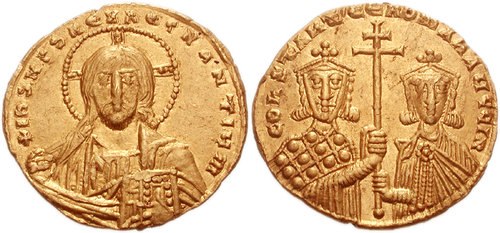
Gold solidus of Romanos II's father Constantine VII (left) and Romanos II (right), with a haloed Christ on reverse

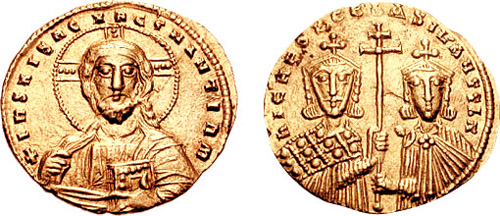
Histamenon of Nikephoros II (left) and Basil II (right)

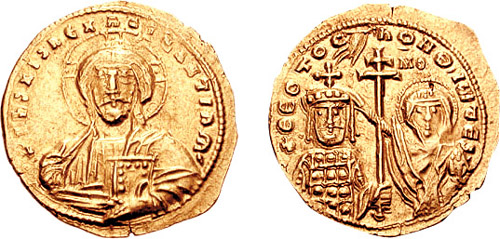
Histamenon of John Tzimiskes crowned by the Virgin Mary

=== Childhood ===
Romanos died suddenly in 963. Although Constantine was only three years old, he had already been crowned co-emperor in the preceding year, probably on 30 March. The widowed Theophano installed herself as regent for her sons and stocked the imperial government with supporters, but she faced competition for power with Joseph Bringas, a former advisor of Romanos. Theophano allied with Nikephoros Phokas, a celebrated general and opponent of Bringas. In return for her hand, the childless Nikephoros gave his sacred pledge to protect her children and their interests. Three months after Romanos' death, supporters of Nikephoros ousted Bringas from power. Nikephoros was crowned emperor in the presence of his nominal co-emperors, Constantine and Basil. A month later he married their mother.

Six years later, Nikephoros was murdered at Theophano's instigation and her lover and co-conspirator John Tzimiskes was acclaimed emperor. Fearing that the empress' many enemies would damage his political prospects, Tzimiskes turned against Theophano and sent her into exile. Constantine and Basil stayed in the capital and retained their status as co-emperors.

=== Adulthood ===
Tzimiskes died in January 976, when Constantine was sixteen years old, and Basil and Constantine became the new heads of state. Nominally the brothers were equals, but Basil devoted himself to the responsibilities of his office and emerged as the senior Basileus. Constantine had no comparable interest in state business, and never developed any. Apart from participating in a military campaign in 989, which ended without any combat, he occupied his years as Basil's colleague with private interests.

In his youth Constantine was tall, graceful, and athletic, with an excellent speaking voice and a good grasp of rhetoric. He participated in wrestling competitions—which he brought back into fashion—and in the training and riding of horses. Alongside these active pursuits he was a gourmet and a gourmand, leading in later years to chronic gout which impaired his ability to walk.

=== Emperor ===
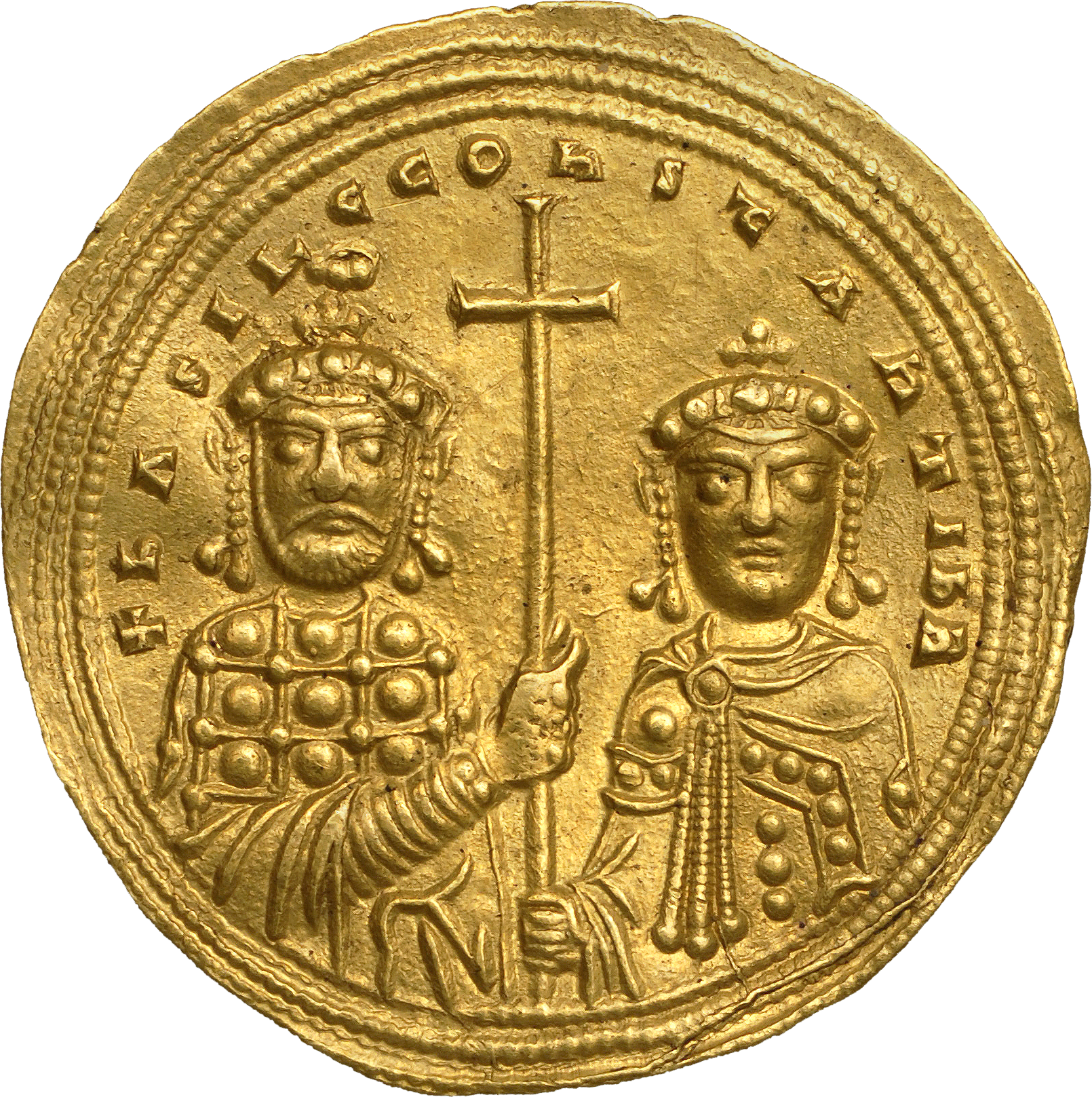
Histamenon of Constantine VIII and Basil II

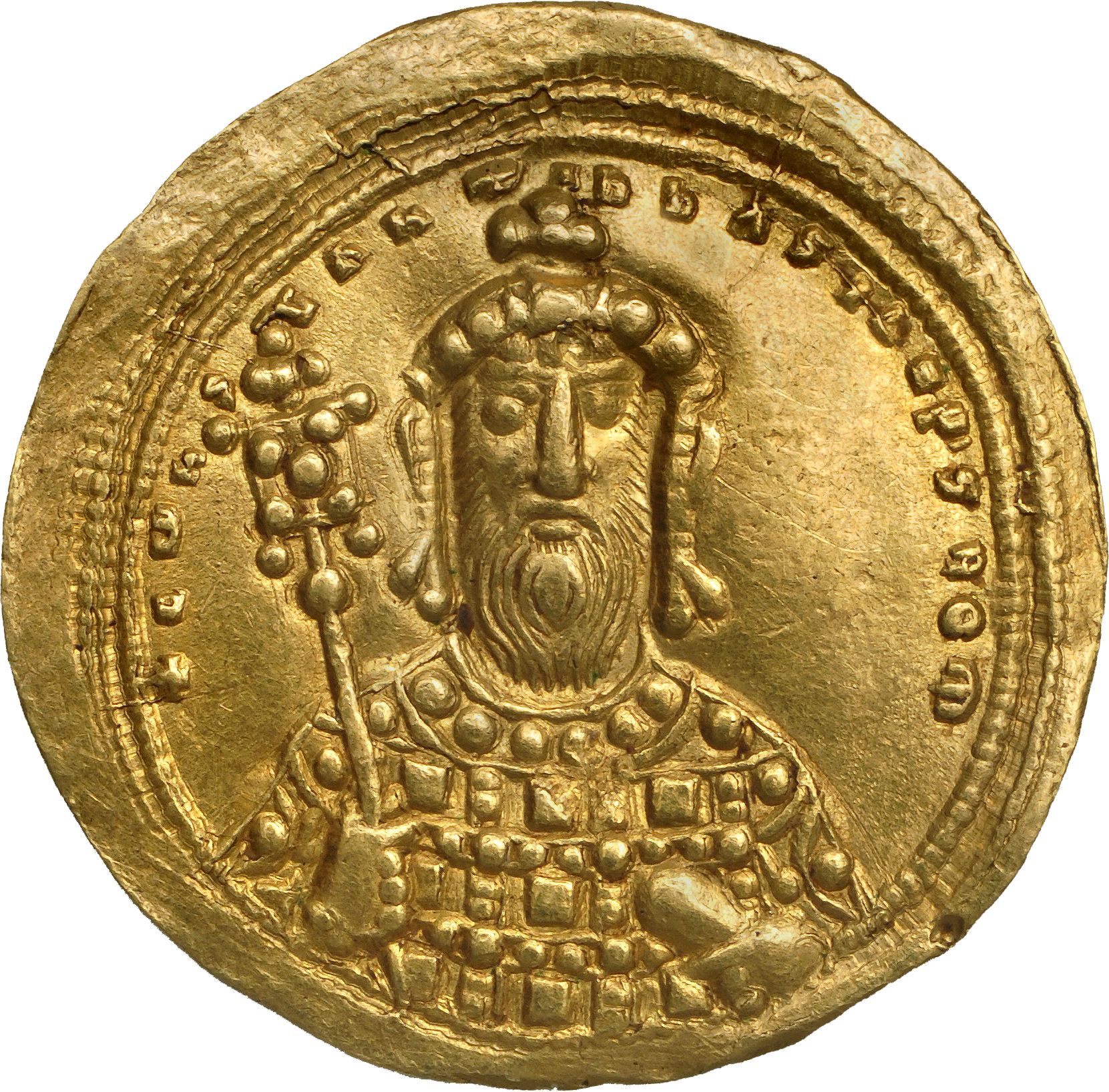
Histamenon of Constantine VIII as sole emperor

Basil II had an illustrious reign, pursuing both government reforms and a series of successful wars. He died childless on 15 December 1025 and Constantine, a sixty-five-year-old widower, became the sole emperor as Constantine VIII. During his long term as co-emperor, he had been content to enjoy the privileges of imperial status, without concerning himself with state affairs. Sole rulership did not fundamentally alter this desire "to pass his life wallowing in extravagant pleasures".

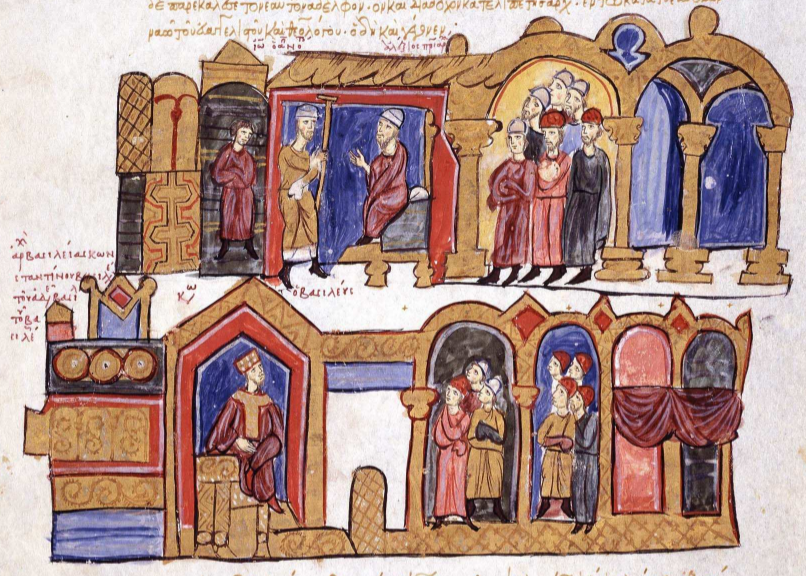
Appointment of Alexius Stoudites as patriarch (top) by Emperor Constantine VIII

The Byzantine aristocracy had been rigorously controlled by Basil II. By comparison, they judged Constantine to be "[d]evoid of any semblance of moral fibre", and worked steadily to extract concessions from him. Unqualified men received senior government posts, and Basil's land laws were dropped under pressure from the aristocracy of Anatolia. These interactions with Constantine were not without risk; when challenged, or led to suspect conspiracies, the emperor responded with impulsive cruelty. Condemned members of the elite suffered torture or were sentenced to blinding.

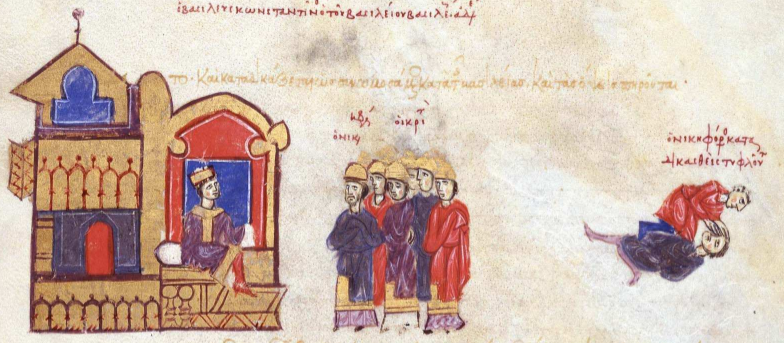
Emperor Constantine VIII (left) orders the blinding of Nikephoros Komnenos. Miniature from the Madrid Skylitzes.

The start of the decline of the Byzantine Empire has been linked to Constantine's accession to the throne. His reign has been described as "an unmitigated disaster", "a break up of the system" and the cause of "a collapse of the military power of the Empire".

He ruled for less than three years before his death, on 11 or 12 November 1028. (Note: Sources do not agree on the exact date of his death.) On his deathbed and without a male heir, Constantine named as successor Constantine Dalessenos, Duke of Antioch, a senior aristocrat and member of one of the few powerful patrician families who had been unswervingly loyal to the Macedonian dynasty. Constantine Dalassenos was summoned from his estates in the Armeniac Theme, with the intention that he should certify his position as successor by marrying the emperor's daughter Zoe. Before Dalassenos completed his journey to Constantinople, the situation had changed. The emperor's advisors preferred a different candidate, Romanos Argyros, who showed promise of being a weak ruler whom they could control. Characteristically, Constantine acquiesced to this preference. Romanos was named as the new imperial heir, and compelled to divorce his wife and marry Zoe. The wedding took place on 12 November and Romanos was crowned four days later.

== Ancestry ==
Ancestors of Constantine VIII

8. Leo VI the Wise
4. Constantine VII
9. Zoe Carbonopsina
2. Romanos II
10. Romanos I Lekapenos
5. Helena Lekapene
11. Theodora
1. Constantine VIII
6. Krateros (a tavern keeper)
3. Theophano

== See also ==
- List of Byzantine emperors

== Notes ==
Constantine VIII Macedonian dynasty Born: 960 Died: 11 November 1028
Regnal titles
Preceded by Romanos II	Byzantine emperor 962–1028 with Romanos II (962–963) with Nikephoros II Phokas (963–969) with John I Tzimiskes (969–976) with Basil II (962–1025)	Succeeded by Romanos III
