= Macedonian dynasty =

Rulers of the Byzantine Empire from 867 to 1056

Macedonian Dynasty
- Country: Byzantine Empire
- Founded: 0867; 1159 years ago
- Founder: Basil I
- Final ruler: Theodora Porphyrogenita
- Titles: Emperor and Autocrat of the Romans
- Connected families: Lecapenus family House of Argyrus
- Deposition: 1056; 970 years ago

The Macedonian dynasty (Ancient Greek: Μακεδονική Δυναστεία) ruled the Byzantine Empire from 867 to 1056, following the Amorian dynasty. During this period, the Byzantine state reached its greatest extent since the early Muslim conquests, and the Macedonian Renaissance in letters and arts began. The dynasty was named after its founder, Basil I the Macedonian, who came from the theme of Macedonia in the region of Thrace.

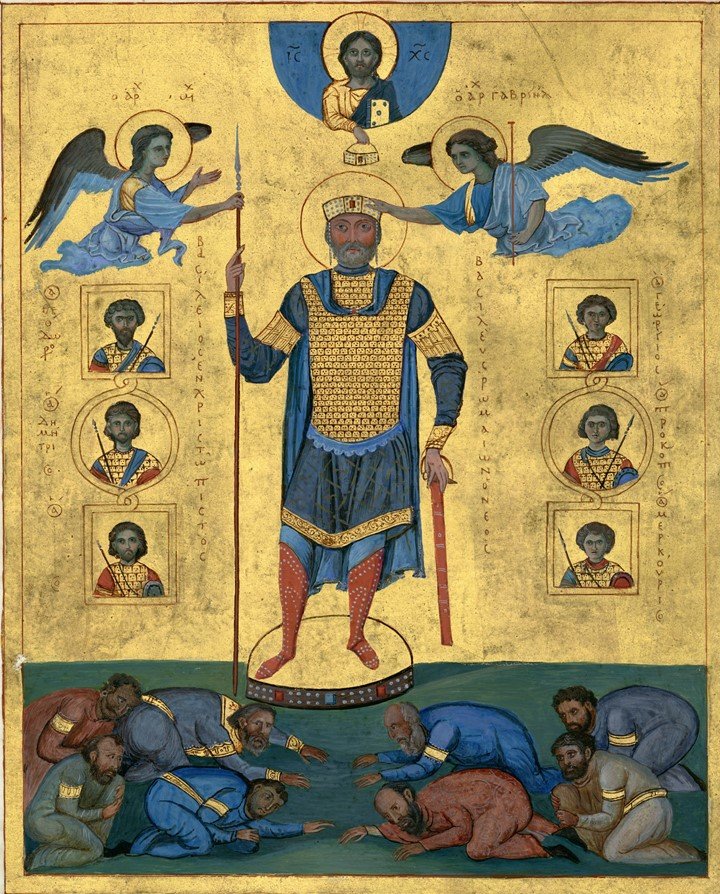
Emperor Basil II the Bulgar Slayer (976–1025).

== Origins ==
The dynasty's ethnic origin is unknown, and has been a subject of debate. During Basil's reign, an elaborate genealogy was produced that purported that his ancestors were not mere peasants, as everyone believed, but descendants of the Arsacid (Arshakuni) kings of Armenia, Alexander the Great and also of Constantine the Great. Some Persian writers such as Hamza al-Isfahani or Al-Tabari, called Basil a Saqlabi, an ethnogeographic term that usually denoted the Slavs, but it can be interpreted as a generic term encompassing the inhabitants of the region between Constantinople and Bulgaria.

Thus, claims have been made for the dynasty's founder (Basil I) being of Armenian, Slavonic, or "Armeno-Slavonic" descent from his paternal side.

The author of the only dedicated biography of Basil I in English has concluded that it is impossible to be certain what the ethnic origins of the emperor were, though Basil was definitely reliant on the support of Armenians in prominent positions within the Byzantine Empire.

== List of rulers ==
- Basil I the Macedonian (Βασίλειος Α') (811–886, ruled 867–886) – married Eudokia Ingerina, mistress of Michael III; died in hunting accident
- Leo VI the Wise (Λέων ΣΤ') (866–912, ruled 886–912) – son of Eudokia Ingerina, legal son and heir of Basil I; possibly the natural son of Michael III; created church crisis with his fourth marriage—Zoe Karbonopsina, who took over as regent for their son, Constantine VII, in 914 and ruled the empire until 919
- Alexander (Αλέξανδρος) (870–913, ruled 912–913) – son of Basil I, regent for nephew
- Constantine VII the Purple-born (Κωνσταντῖνος Ζ') (905–959, ruled 913–920 and 945-959) – son of Leo VI and Zoe Karbonopsina; married Helena, daughter of Romanos Lekapenos
- Romanos I Lekapenos (Ῥωμανός A') (c. 870–948, ruled 920–944) – staged a successful coup in 919 and became senior emperor in 920; deposed in 944 and exiled
- Romanos II the Purple-born (Ῥωμανός Β') (938–963, ruled 959–963) – son of Constantine VII and maternal grandson of Romanos I
- Nikephoros II Phokas (Νικηφόρος Β' Φωκᾶς) (912–969, ruled 963–969) – successful general, married Romanos II's widow, regent for Basil; assassinated (Origin: Cappadocian)
- John I Tzimiskes (Ἰωάννης Α')(925-976, ruled 969–976) – successful general, brother-in-law of Romanos II, lover of Nikephoros's wife but banned from marriage, regent for Basil II and Constantine VIII
- Basil II (Βασίλειος Β') the Bulgar-slayer (958–1025, ruled 976–1025) – son of Romanos II
- Constantine VIII (Κωνσταντῖνος Η') (960-1028, ruled 1025–1028) – son of Romanos II; silent co-emperor with Basil II, sole emperor after his brother's death
- Zoe (Ζωή) (c. 978–1050, ruled 1028–1050) – daughter of Constantine VIII
- Romanos III Argyros (Ῥωμανός Γ') (968–1034, ruled 1028–1034) – eparch of Constantinople; Zoe's first husband, arranged by Constantine VIII; murdered
- Michael IV the Paphlagonian (Μιχαήλ Δ') (1010–1041, ruled 1034–1041) – Zoe's second husband
- Michael V the Caulker (Μιχαήλ Ε') (1015–1042, ruled 1041–1042) – Michael IV's nephew, Zoe's adopted son
- Theodora (Θεοδώρα) (980–1056, ruled 1042) – daughter of Constantine VIII, co-empress with Zoe
- Constantine IX Monomachos (Κωνσταντῖνος Θ') (1000–1055, ruled 1042–1055) – Zoe's third husband
- Theodora (Θεοδώρα) (ruled 1055–1056) – restored

=== Non-dynastic ===
- Michael VI (Μιχαήλ Ϛ') (ruled 1056–1057) – chosen by Theodora; deposed and entered monastery

== Family tree ==
- Basil I the Macedonian (813–886)
  - from his marriage to Maria:
    - Constantine (865–878), co-emperor with his father
    - Anastasia
  - from his marriage to empress Eudokia Ingerina:
    - Leo VI the Wise (866–912)
      - Eudokia (died 892)
      - Anna, betrothed and married to Louis the Blind
      - Basil (died 900)
      - Constantine VII Porphyrogennetos (905–959), married Helena Lekapene, daughter of Romanos I Lekapenos
        - Romanos II (938–963) married to Bertha, daughter of Hugh of Italy king of Italy
          - childless by his marriage to Bertha of Italy
          - from his marriage to Theophano:
            - Basil II the Bulgar-Slayer (957–1025)
            - Constantine VIII (961–1028) married Helena, daughter of Alypius
              - Eudokia
              - Zoe (978–1050), married:
                1. Romanos III Argyros (ca. 968–1034)
                2. Michael IV the Paphlagonian (1015–1042)
                3. Constantine IX Monomachos (ca. 1000–1055)
              - Theodora (980–1056)
            - Anna Porphyrogeneta (963–1011), married Vladimir I of Kiev
        - Agathe
        - Theodora, married John I Tzimiskes
    - Stephen I (867–893), Patriarch of Constantinople
    - Alexander (870–913)

== Genealogy ==
Family tree of the Macedonian dynasty and related Byzantine emperors

Michael III emperor of the Romans; 842–867; AMORIAN DYNASTY	Eudokia Ingerina	Basil I emperor of the Romans; 867–886	Maria
Romanos I Lekapenos emperor of the Romans; 920–944	1. Theophano Martinakia; 2. Zoe Zaoutzaina; 3. Eudokia Baïana; 4. Zoe Karbonopsina	Leo VI the Wise emperor of the Romans; 886–912	Stephen I Patriarch of Constantinople; 886–893	Alexander emperor of the Romans; 912–913
Christopher Lekapenos co-emperor 921–931 ∞ Sophia	Agatha ∞ Romanos Argyros	Theophylact; Patriarch of Constantinople; 933–956	Helena Lekapene (Lekapenos)	(4) Constantine VII emperor of the Romans; 913–959	(2) Anna ∞ Louis III the Blind king of Provence, king of Lombardy; Bosonids
(Maria) Irene Lekapene ∞ Peter I king of Bulgaria; 927–969	Argyros	Nikephoros II Phokas emperor of the Romans; 963–969; Phokas	(Anastasia) Theophano from Laconia	Romanos II emperor of the Romans; 959–963	Theodora Porphyrogenita empress	John I Tzimiskes emperor of the Romans; 969–976; Kourkouas	Charles Constantine count of Vienne
Pothos (or Eustathios) Argyros general	Basil II emperor of the Romans; 976–1025	Constantine VIII emperor of the Romans; 1025–1028 ∞ Helena of Alypius	Anna Porphyrogenita ∞ Vladimir I the Great grand prince of Kiev; Rurik dynasty	Constance of Vienne ∞ Boson II count of Arles
Maria Argyre ∞ Giovanni Orseolo duke of Dalmatia	Basil Argyros general of Samos	1.Romanos III Argyros emperor of the Romans; 1028–1034	Zoë Porphyrogenita empress of the Romans; 1028–1050 ∞ 2.Michael IV the Paphlagonian emperor of the Romans 1034–1041	3.Constantine IX Monomachos emperor of the Romans; 1042–1055	Helena Skleraina	Theodora empress of the Romans; 1055–1056
(daughter) ∞ Constantine Diogenes	(adopted) Michael V Kalaphates emperor of the Romans; 1041–1042	Anastasia Monomachaina ∞ Vsevolod I of Kiev
Romanos IV Diogenes emperor of Romans; 1068–1071	Eudokia Makrembolitissa empress	Constantine X Doukas emperor of the Romans; 1059–1067; DOUKAS DYNASTY	Vladimir II Monomakh grand prince of Kiev

== See also ==
- Lekapenos
- Phokas (Byzantine family)
- Byzantine Empire under the Macedonian dynasty

== Sources ==
- Fine, John V. A. Jr. (1991) [1983]. The Early Medieval Balkans: A Critical Survey from the Sixth to the Late Twelfth Century. Ann Arbor: University of Michigan Press. ISBN 0-472-08149-7.
- Finlay, George (1853). History of the Byzantine Empire from 716–1057. William Blackwood & Sons.
- Obolensky, Dimitri (1974) [1971]. The Byzantine Commonwealth: Eastern Europe, 500–1453. London: Cardinal. ISBN 978-0351176449.
- Ostrogorsky, George (1956). History of the Byzantine State. Oxford: Basil Blackwell.
- Runciman, Steven (1988) [1929]. The Emperor Romanus Lecapenus and His Reign: A Study of Tenth-Century Byzantium. Cambridge University Press. ISBN 978-0521357227.
- Stephenson, Paul (2000). Byzantium's Balkan Frontier: A Political Study of the Northern Balkans, 900–1204. Cambridge University Press. ISBN 978-0521770170.
- Stephenson, Paul (2003). The Legend of Basil the Bulgar-Slayer. Cambridge: Cambridge University Press. ISBN 978-0521815307.
- Thurn, Hans, ed. (1973). Ioannis Scylitzae Synopsis historiarum. Berlin-New York: De Gruyter. ISBN 978-3110022858.
- Treadgold, Warren (1997). A History of the Byzantine State and Society. Stanford, California: Stanford University Press. ISBN 0-8047-2630-2.
- Vasiliev, Alexander Alexandrovich (1928–1935). History of the Byzantine Empire. Madison, Wisconsin: The University of Wisconsin Press. ISBN 0-299-80925-0.
