= Theodora Porphyrogenita =

Byzantine empress from 1042 to 1056

- Augusta; Empress and Autocratess of the Romans
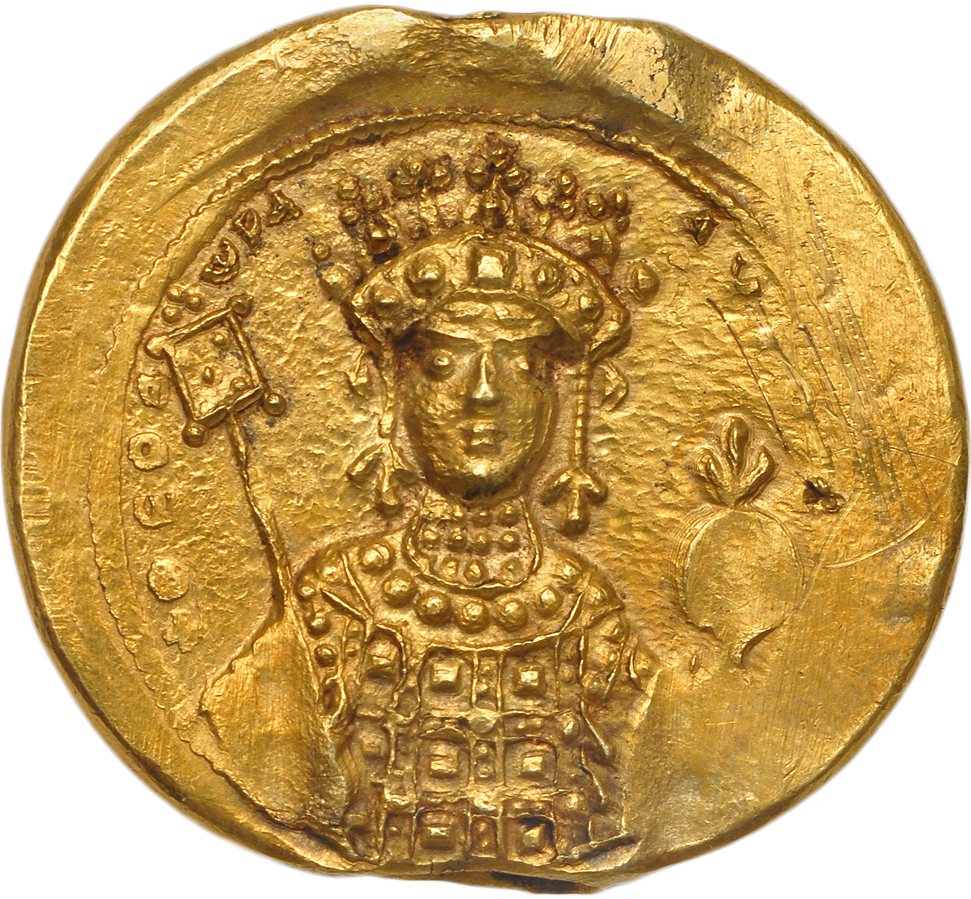
- Golden seal of Theodora, 1056

Byzantine empress regnant
- 1st reign: 21 April 1042 – 11 June 1042
- Predecessor: Michael V
- Successor: Constantine IX
- Co-sovereign: Zoe (as senior empress) (Note: Zoe and Theodora reigned together in 1042, but Zoe was the senior empress while Theodora was the junior empress.)
- 2nd reign: 11 January 1055 – 31 August 1056
- Predecessor: Constantine IX
- Successor: Michael VI

Byzantine co-empress
- Reign: 11 June 1042 – 11 January 1055
- Co-rulers: Constantine IX (1042–55, senior emperor); Zoe (1042–50, augusta)
- Born: c. 980; Constantinople, Byzantine Empire
- Died: 31 August 1056 (aged 75/76); Constantinople, Byzantine Empire
- Burial: Nunnery of St Euphemia in Petrion (possibly)
- Dynasty: Macedonian
- Father: Constantine VIII
- Mother: Helena
- Religion: Chalcedonian Christianity
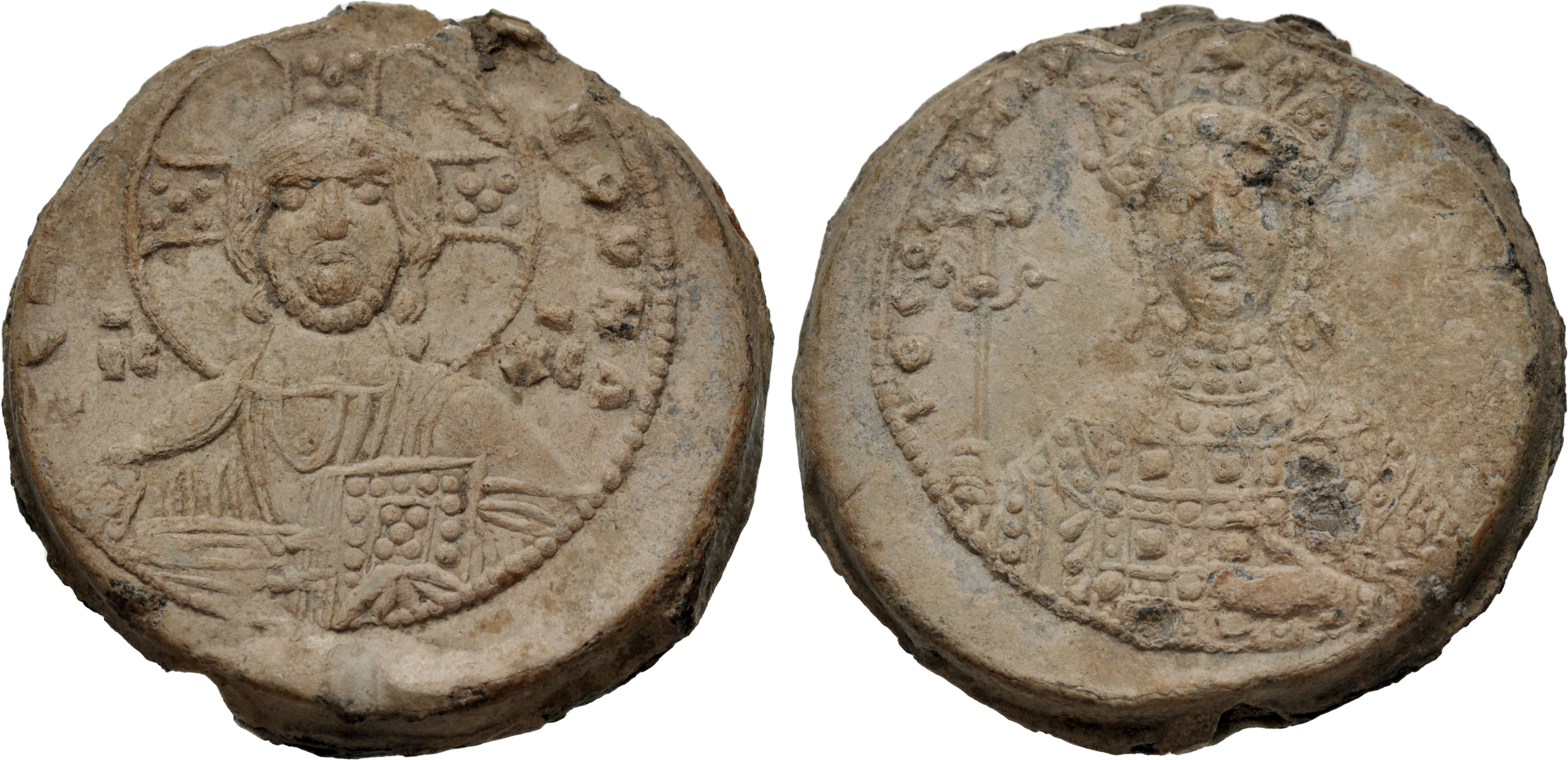
- Seal

Theodora Porphyrogenita (Note: Sometimes enumerated as Theodora III, after Justinian I's wife Theodora (I) and the previous empress Theodora (II).) (Greek: Θεοδώρα Πορφυρογέννητη, romanized: Theodṓra Porphyrogénnētē; c. 980 – 31 August 1056) was the reigning Byzantine Empress from 21 April 1042 to her death on 31 August 1056, and sole ruler from 11 January 1055. She was the last sovereign of the Macedonian dynasty, which had ruled the Byzantine Empire for almost 200 years.

Theodora was the youngest daughter of Emperor Constantine VIII. After Theodora's father died in 1028, her older sister Zoë, as Augusta, co-ruled with her husbands Romanos III and Michael IV, kept Theodora closely watched. After two foiled plots, Theodora was exiled to an island monastery in the Sea of Marmara in 1031. A decade later, the people of Constantinople rose against Michael IV's nephew and successor, Michael V, and insisted that Theodora return to rule alongside Zoë.

After 65 days Zoë married again, to Constantine IX, who assumed the imperial responsibilities. Theodora seemingly retired to a convent after Zoë's death in 1050. When Constantine died, the 74-year-old Theodora returned to the throne despite fierce opposition from court officials and military claimants. For 16 months she ruled as empress in her own right before succumbing to a sudden illness and dying at 76. She was the last ruler of the Macedonian line.

== Early life ==
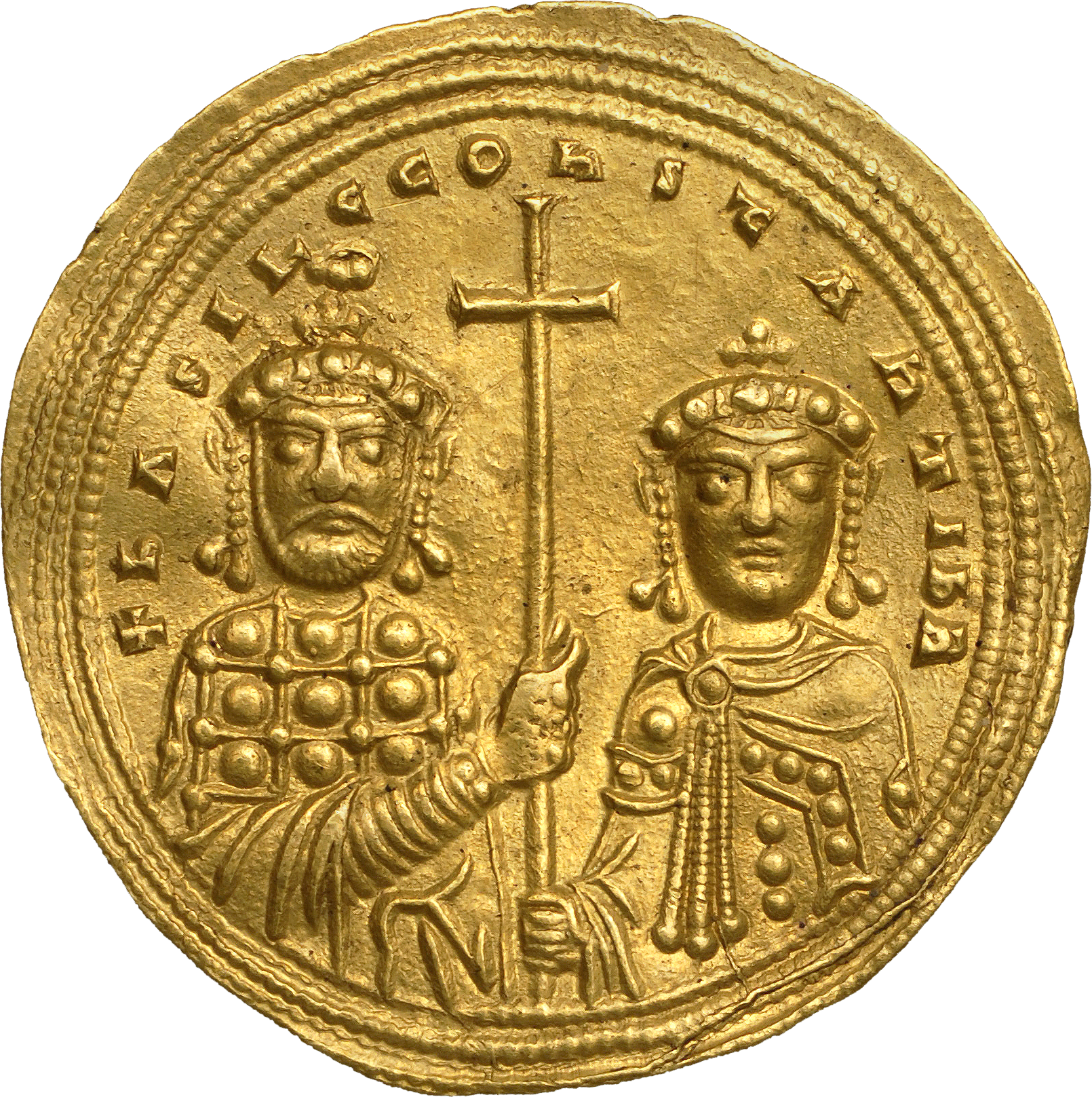
Histamenon depicting Basil II and Constantine VIII holding a cross

Theodora was the third and youngest daughter of Byzantine Emperor Constantine VIII and Helena, daughter of Alypius. She was a Porphyrogenita, "born into the purple"; the appellation for a child born in the capital to a reigning emperor. Her father became co-emperor in 962 and sole emperor upon the death of his brother Basil II in 1025. His reign as sole emperor lasted less than three years, from 15 December 1025 to 12 November 1028.

As an eligible imperial princess, Theodora was considered as a possible bride for the Holy Roman Emperor in the west, Otto III, in 996. However, she was overlooked in favour of her sister Zoë. Otto III died before any marriage could occur. Basil II prevented his nieces from marrying any of the Byzantine nobility, calculating that such a marriage would have given their husbands a claim on the imperial throne. As women, Theodora and Zoë were unable to exercise any state authority; their only say in this was in choosing, or more likely accepting or not, a husband who would acquire their authority upon marriage. Consequently, Theodora lived a life of virtual obscurity in the imperial gynaeceum (women's quarters).

Intelligent and possessing a strong and austere character, Theodora defied Constantine—by then, sole emperor—by refusing to marry the man her father had chosen to succeed him, Romanos Argyros, stating that Romanos was already married—his wife having become a nun to allow Romanos to marry into the imperial family. Theodora further claimed that since Romanos and she were third cousins, it was too close a blood relationship for marriage to occur. Consequently, Constantine VIII chose Theodora's sister. Zoë married Romanos three days before her father died.

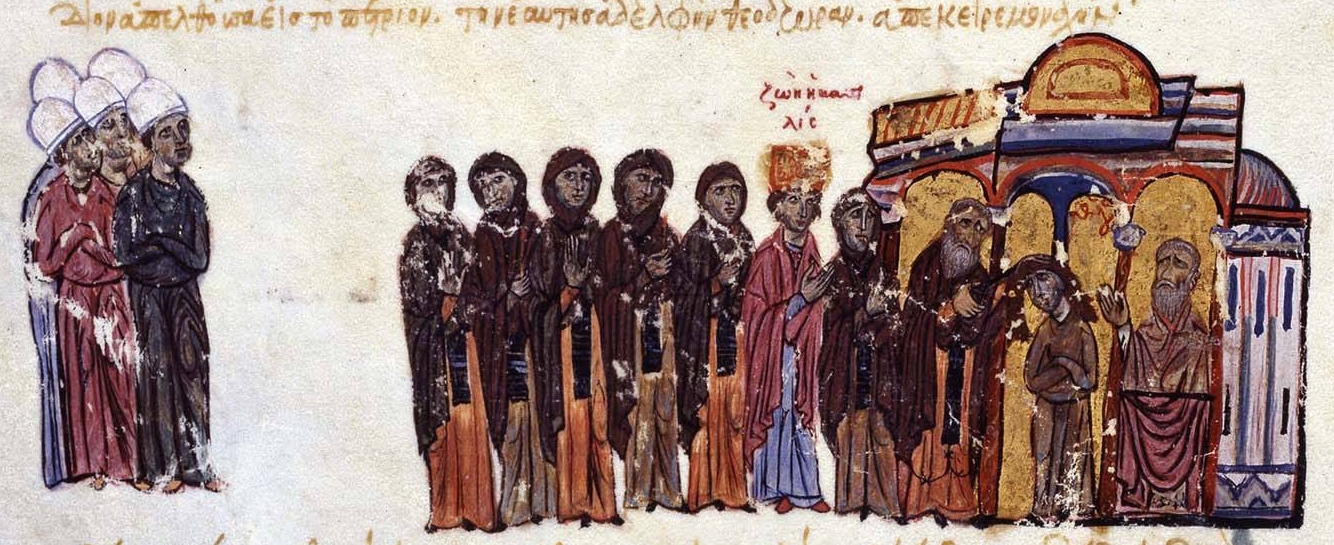
Tonsure of Theodora, miniature from the Madrid Skylitzes, 12th century.

With the accession of Romanos, Theodora prudently retreated back into the gynaeceum, with its daily religious routines. Still, Zoë persuaded her husband to appoint one of his own men as the chief of Theodora's household, with orders to spy on her. Shortly afterwards, Theodora was accused of plotting to marry the Bulgarian prince Presian and usurp the throne with him. Presian was blinded and sent to a monastery; Theodora was not punished. In 1031 she was implicated in a similar conspiracy, this time with Constantine Diogenes, the Archon of Sirmium. Theodora was forcibly confined in the monastery of Petrion. During a visit, Zoë compelled her sister to "assume the monastic habit." Theodora remained there for the next 11 years as Zoë managed the empire with her husbands Romanos III and, after his death, Michael IV.

== Co-empress with Zoë ==
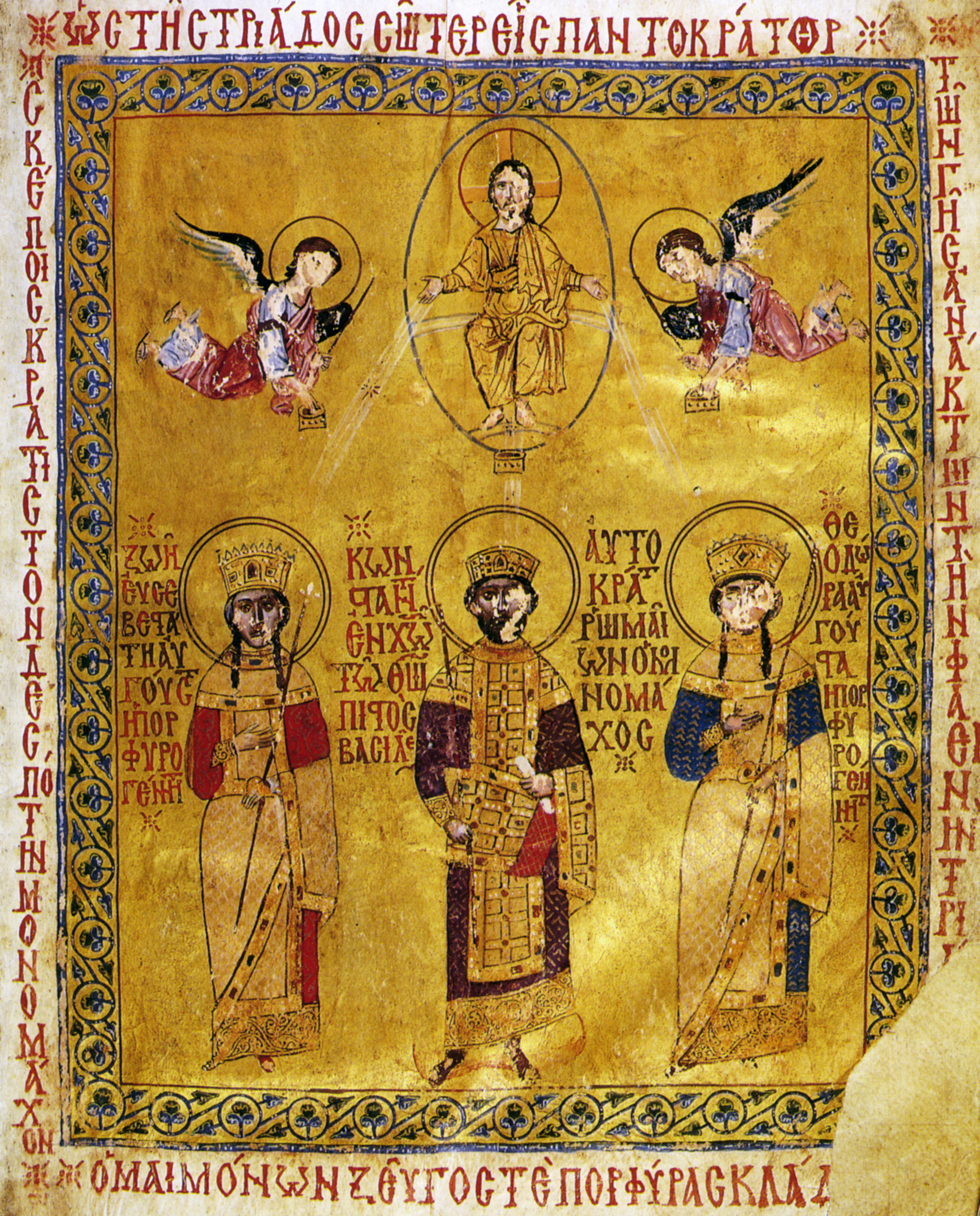
Miniature with the portraits of Zoë (left), Constantine IX (center) and Theodora (right).

With Michael IV's death in December 1041, Zoë adopted Michael's nephew, who was crowned as Michael V. Although he promised to respect Zoë, he eventually banished her to a monastery on the Princes' Islands on charges of attempted regicide. This treatment of the legitimate heir to the Macedonian dynasty caused a popular uprising in Constantinople, and on 19 April 1042, the people revolted against Michael V in support of not only Zoë, but Theodora as well. Michael V, desperate to keep his throne, initially brought Zoë back from the Princes' Island and displayed her to the people, but the population rejected his proposal that he continue to rule alongside Zoë.

Key members of the court decided that flighty Zoë needed a co-ruler, and backed the people's demand that it should be Theodora. A delegation, headed by the patrician Constantine Cabasilas, went to the monastery at Petrion to convince Theodora to become co-empress. Theodora, accustomed to a life of religious contemplation, rejected their pleas out of hand, and fled to the convent chapel to seek sanctuary. Constantine and his retinue pursued her, forcibly dragged her out and exchanged her monastic clothes for imperial ones. At an assembly at Hagia Sophia, the people escorted the now furious Theodora and proclaimed her empress with Zoë. They were both crowned at dawn on 21 April. After the ceremony, the mob stormed the palace, forcing Michael V to escape to a monastery.

Zoë immediately assumed power and tried to force Theodora back to her monastery, but the Senate and the people demanded that the two sisters should jointly reign. As her first act Theodora was called upon to deal with Michael V. Zoë, weak and easily manipulated, wanted to pardon and free Michael, but Theodora was far more strict. She initially guaranteed Michael's safety before ordering that he be blinded and spend the rest of his life as a monk. With Michael V dealt with, Theodora refused to leave Hagia Sophia until she had received a formal invitation from Zoë, some 24 hours after they had been crowned. Officially Theodora was the junior empress, and her throne was situated slightly behind Zoë's on all public occasions. In practice she was the driving force behind the joint administration. The sisters administered the empire, focusing on curbing the sale of public offices and on the administration of justice. Although contemporary historian Michael Psellus claimed the joint reign was a complete failure, John Scylitzes stated that they conscientiously rectified the abuses of the previous reigns.

Although Theodora and Zoë appeared together at meetings of the Senate or when they gave public audiences, it was soon apparent that their joint reign was under considerable strain. Still jealous of Theodora, Zoë had no desire to administer the empire, but she would not allow Theodora to conduct public business alone. Court factions formed behind each empress. After two months of increasing acrimony between them, Zoë decided to search for a new husband, thereby denying Theodora the opportunity to increase her influence through her obvious talents for governing. She eventually married Constantine IX, on 11 June 1042, and the management of the empire reverted to him. Although Theodora and Zoë continued to be recognised as empresses, and although Theodora continued to appear at all official functions, power devolved onto her brother-in-law. Nevertheless, Theodora exerted influence at court, as demonstrated by her ordering the arrest and blinding of John the Eunuch, the powerful administrator who had been the chief minister of Romanos III, the brother of Michael IV, and the uncle of Michael V; he had lived in exile after the fall of Michael V.

Constantine IX's preferential treatment of his mistress in the early part of his reign caused rumours that he was planning to murder Theodora and Zoë. This led to a popular uprising by the citizens of Constantinople in 1044, which came dangerously close to actually harming Constantine who was participating in a religious procession along the streets of Constantinople. The mob was only quieted by the appearance on a balcony of Zoë and Theodora, who reassured the mob they were in no danger of assassination.

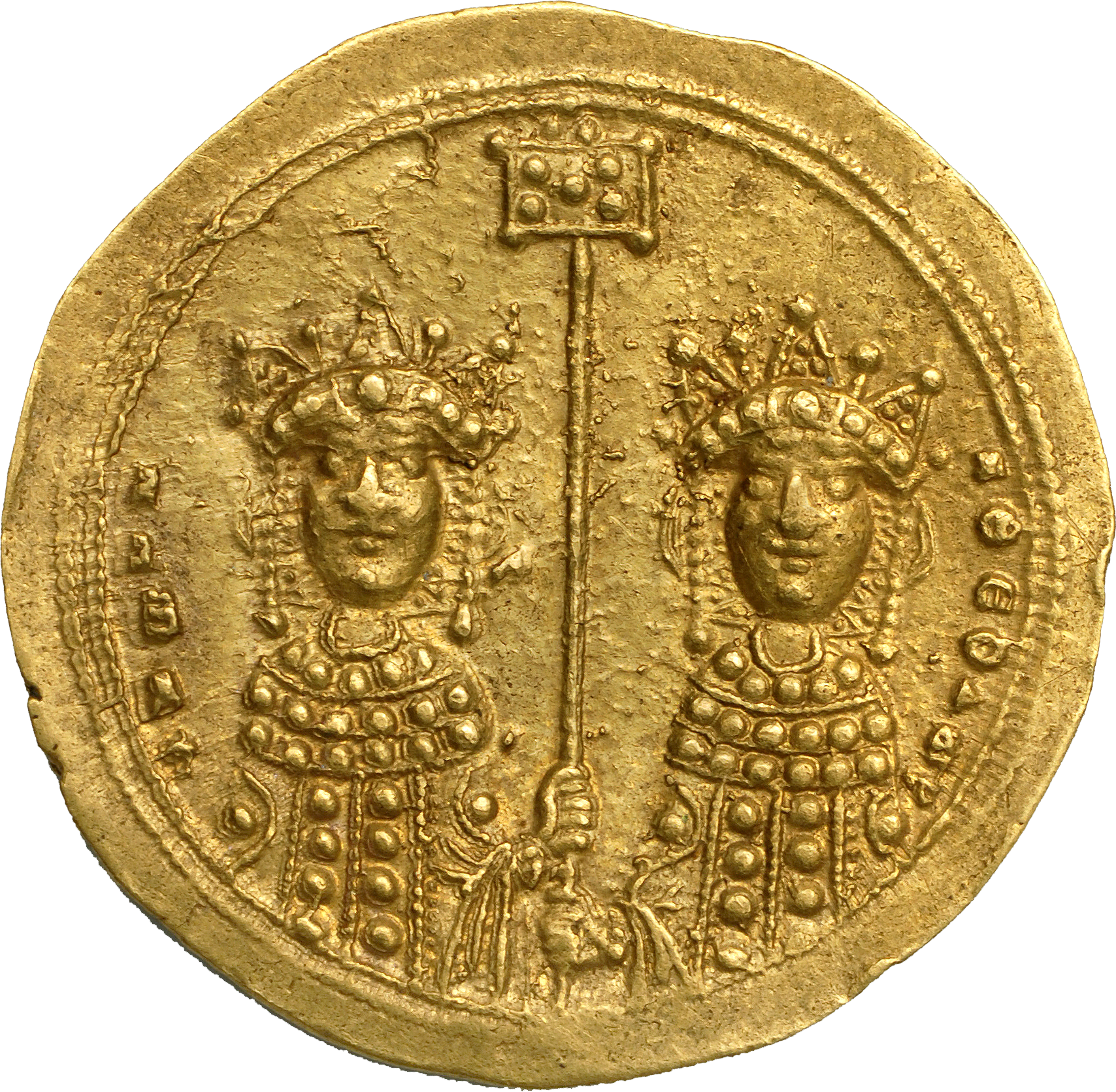
Gold histamenon of Zoë and Theodora, 1042

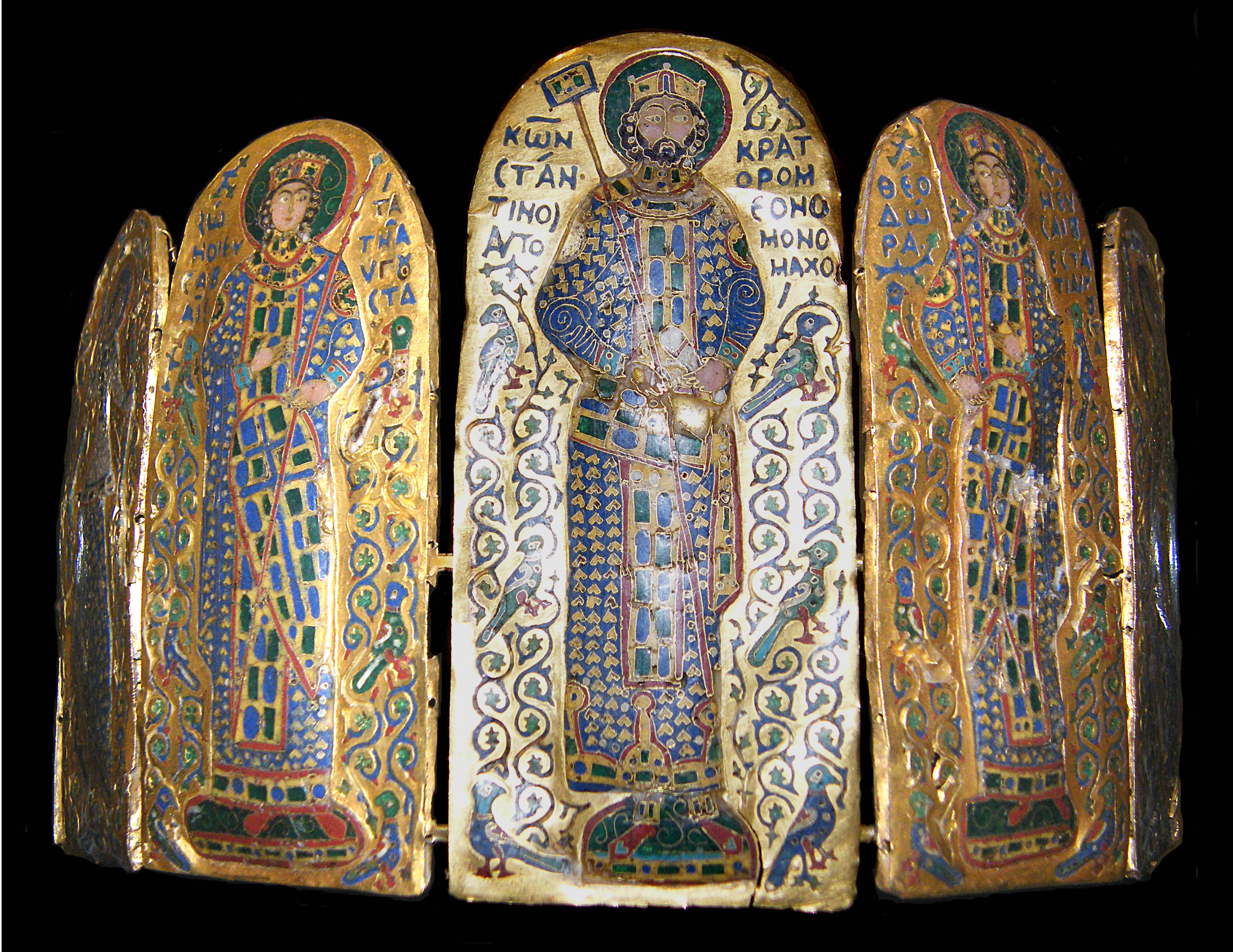
Zoë (left), Constantine IX (centre), and Theodora (right) depicted on the Monomachus Crown

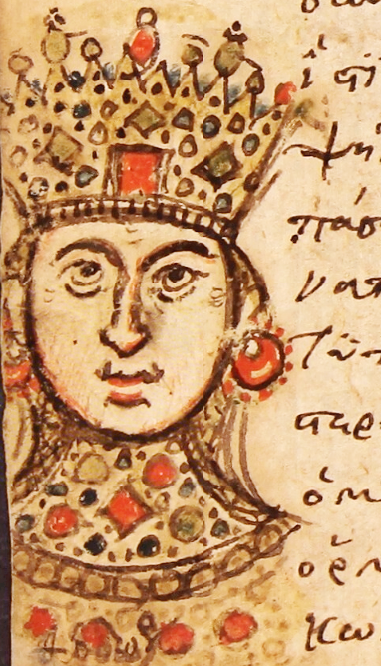
15th-century portrait of Theodora in the Mutinensis gr. 122

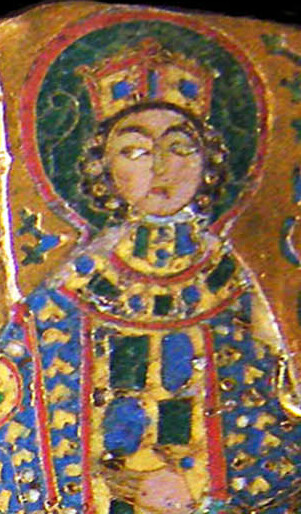
Theodora depicted on the Monomachus Crown

== Return to power ==
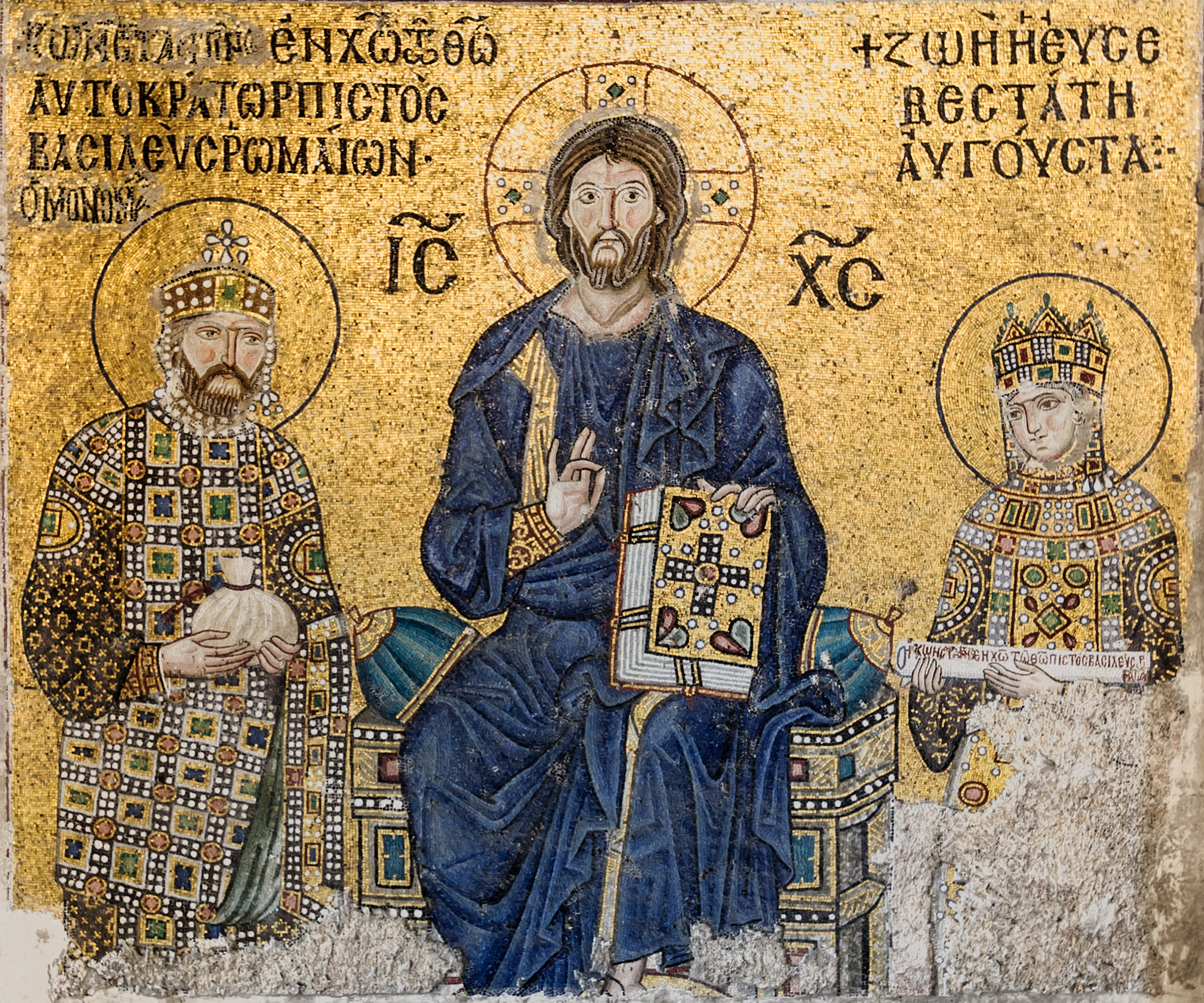
Hagia Sophia mosaic of a seated Christ Pantocrator, with Zoë standing to the right and Constantine IX standing to the left

After Zoë's death in 1050, Theodora seems to have retired to a convent, leaving Constantine IX to rule alone until his own death on 11 January 1055. As Constantine lay dying, he was persuaded by his councilors, chiefly the logothetes tou dromou John, to ignore the rights of Theodora and to pass the throne to the doux (Duke) of the Byzantine Theme of Bulgaria, Nikephoros Proteuon, who was summoned to the capital. However, Niketas Xylinites and other supporters of Theodora caught wind of this and persuaded her to reassert her right to rule. Theodora was brought from her monastic retirement to the Great Palace by warship, convened the Senate, and the imperial guard proclaimed her "emperor" shortly before Constantine's death.

A purge of senior officials and the leadership of the European military units followed. Nikephoros Proteuon was arrested at Thessalonica and forcibly tonsured. Nikephoros Bryennios, whom the western tagmata apparently wanted to proclaim emperor instead, was dismissed and exiled on Theodora's orders, after which she confiscated his estates and banished his supporters from court.

Theodora controlled the nobles and checked numerous abuses. She damaged her reputation, however, with excessive severity toward private enemies and undue employment of such menials as Leo Paraspondylos as her advisors. Military and court offices were filled by her household eunuchs, and such able commanders as Isaac Komnenos were replaced with minor functionaries. Determined to centralize as much power in her hands as possible, she presided in person in the Senate and heard appeals as supreme judge in civil cases. Her appointment of clerics offended the Patriarch Michael Keroularios, who considered this the duty of men, not women.

During Theodora's sole ruling period, her coins and seals bear the inscription 'Theodora, δέσποινα (déspoina) and porphyrogenita' and 'Theodora, Augusta and porphyrogenita'.

When Theodora was seventy-six, the patriarch Michael Keroularios advocated that Theodora advance a subject to the throne through marriage to her, in order to assure a succession. She refused to consider marriage, no matter how token. She also refused to name an heir to the throne. Theodora became gravely ill with an intestinal disorder in late August 1056. On 31 August her advisors, chaired by Leo Paraspondylos, met to decide whom to recommend to her as a successor. According to Psellus, they selected Michael Bringas, an aged civil servant and former military finance minister whose main attraction was that "he was less qualified to rule than he was to be ruled and directed by others". Theodora was unable to speak, but Paraspondylos decided that she had nodded at an appropriate moment. Hearing of this the Patriarch refused to believe it. Eventually he was persuaded and Bringas was crowned as Michael VI. Theodora died a few hours later and with her death, the Macedonian dynasty's 189-year rule ended.

== See also ==
- List of Byzantine emperors

== Sources ==
=== Primary sources ===
- Michael Psellus, Chronographia.
- Thurn, Hans, ed. (1973). Ioannis Scylitzae Synopsis historiarum. Berlin & New York: De Gruyter. ISBN 978-3-11-002285-8. OCLC 1025783.

=== Secondary sources ===
- Finlay, George (1853). History of the Byzantine Empire from 716–1057. William Blackwood & Sons.
- Chisholm, Hugh, ed. (1911). "Theodora" . Encyclopædia Britannica. Vol. 26 (11th ed.). Cambridge University Press. p. 765.
- Kazhdan, Alexander, ed. (1991). The Oxford Dictionary of Byzantium. Oxford and New York: Oxford University Press. ISBN 0-19-504652-8.
- Garland, Lynda (1999). Byzantine Empresses: Women and Power in Byzantium, AD 527–1204. London & New York: Routledge. ISBN 978-0-415-14688-3.
- Mitchell, Linda Elizabeth (2004). "Women Where They Ought Not to Be? Revising the View of the Medieval World". Journal of Women's History. 16 (1): 183–189. doi:10.1353/jowh.2004.0031. S2CID 144044065.
- Norwich, John Julius (1993), Byzantium #2 The Apogee, London: Penguin, ISBN 978-0-14-011448-5
- Treadgold, Warren T. (1997), A History of the Byzantine State and Society, Stanford, CA: Stanford University Press, ISBN 978-0-8047-2630-6

Theodora Porphyrogenita Macedonian dynasty Born: c. 980 Died: 31 August 1056
Regnal titles
Preceded by Michael V	Byzantine Empress; 1042 with Zoe	Succeeded by Constantine IX
Preceded by Constantine IX	Byzantine Empress; 1055–1056	Succeeded by Michael VI
