= Helena (daughter of Alypius) =

Byzantine empress (fl. late 10th century)

- Augusta

Empress of the Byzantine Empire
- Tenure: 976?–before 1025
- Born: 960s?
- Died: c. 989? definitely before 1025
- Spouse: Constantine VIII
- Issue: Eudokia; Zoe Porphyrogenita; Theodora Porphyrogenita
- Father: Alypius

Helena Alypia (Greek: Ελένη Αλυπία, Helénē Alypía; 960s? – c. 989?) was a Byzantine empress consort as the wife of Byzantine Emperor Constantine VIII.

== Life ==
Very little is known about her, as she is only briefly mentioned in the Chronographia of Michael Psellos, followed by the works of John Skylitzes and Zonaras. Psellos writes of her only that:

"Constantine while still a young man, had married a lady called Helena. She was a daughter of the renowned Alypius, then the leading man in the city and member of a noble family held in high repute. This lady, who was not only beautiful but also virtuous, bore him three daughters before she died."

Apart from this reference in Psellos, her father Alypius (Αλυπίος) is otherwise unknown. The marriage probably took place ca. 976, and Helena died at some unknown point, apparently long before her husband became sole emperor in 1025. The historian Gunther G. Wolf theorized that she died ca. 989, possibly during the birth of her third daughter. Theodora is generally thought to have been born in the early rather than late 980s, however.

Their three daughters were:

Helena's two younger daughters

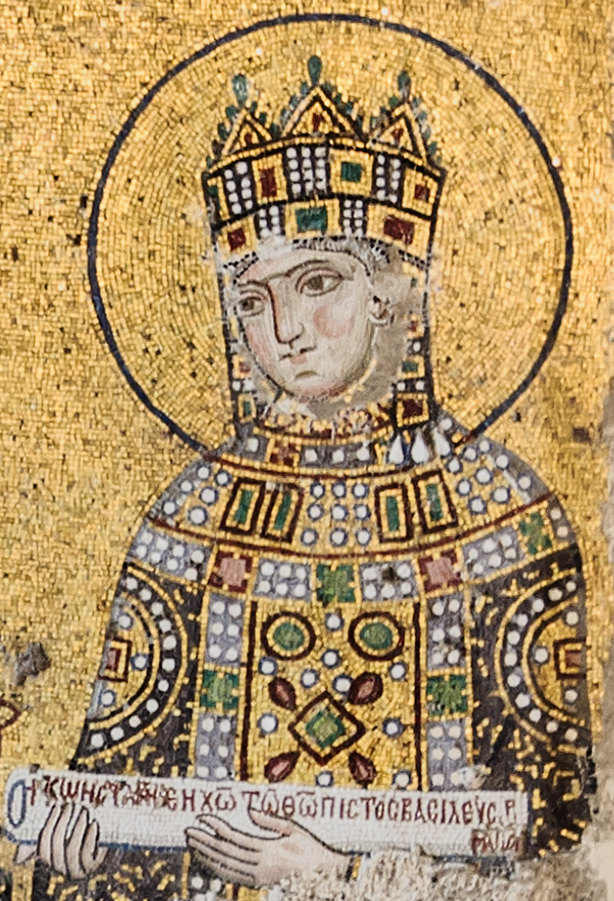
Zoë

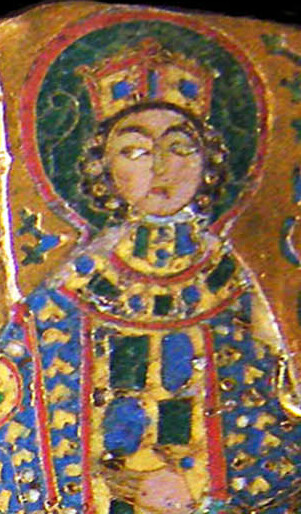
Theodora

- Eudokia (Ευδοκία). Eldest daughter. According to the Chronographia "in childhood she had been attacked by some infectious illness, and her looks had been marred ever since". She later became a nun.
- Zoë Porphyrogenita. Augusta 1028–1050, empress consort for much of that time (except from 1041-1042), and empress regnant in spring 1042.
- Theodora Porphyrogenita. Empress regnant in spring 1042 (sharing with Zoe) and sole empress regnant 1055–56.

At the time of their marriage, Constantine VIII was the co-ruler of his older brother Basil II. Basil reigned as senior Byzantine Emperor from 976 to 1025 but never married, which would make Helena the only Augusta during his reign.

== Sources ==
- Cheynet, Jean-Claude, Pouvoir et Contestations a Byzance (963-1210), Paris: Publications de la Sorbonne, 1996.
- Lilie, Ralph-Johannes; Ludwig, Claudia; Pratsch, Thomas; Zielke, Beate (2013). Prosopographie der mittelbyzantinischen Zeit Online. Berlin-Brandenburgische Akademie der Wissenschaften. Nach Vorarbeiten F. Winkelmanns erstellt (in German). Berlin and Boston: De Gruyter.
- Settipani, Christian, Continuité des élites à Byzance durant les siècles obscurs. Les princes caucasiens et l'Empire du VIe au IXe siècle, Paris: De Boccard, 2006.

Royal titles
Preceded by Theodora	Byzantine Empress consort ca. 976 – unknown	Succeeded by Zoe Porphyrogenita
