= Dalassenos =

Byzantine aristocratic family

Dalassenos (Greek: Δαλασσηνός), feminine form Dalassene or Dalassena (Greek: Δαλασσηνή), was a Byzantine aristocratic family prominent in the 11th century.

== Origins and rise to prominence ==
The family's name derives from their ancestral home, the city of Dalassa, in Cappadocia (modern Talas in eastern Turkey). The ethnic origin of the family is unknown; the Armenian historian Nicholas Adontz identified them as Armenians, but their names are not Armenian, and most scholars hesitate to accept Adontz's suggestion.

The first prominent member of the family was the magistros Damian Dalassenos, who held the important post of doux of Antioch in 995/996–998. His sons also reached senior offices: two of them, Constantine and Theophylaktos, also occupied the post of doux of Antioch, while Romanos Dalassenos was katepano of Iberia. The East, and Antioch in particular, seem to have been the preserve and main power-base of the family during the first decades of the 11th century.

Constantine in particular was a favourite of Emperor Constantine VIII (r. 962–1028), who reportedly considered naming him his heir shortly before his death. Under Romanos III Argyros (r. 1028–1034) the family remained loyal, at least outwardly. Constantine, however, is accused in some sources of having played a role in the failure of Romanos's campaign against Aleppo in 1030. Constantine then emerged as the leader of the aristocratic opposition during the reigns of Michael IV the Paphlagonian (r. 1034–1041) and Michael V (r. 1041–1042). This led to repressive measures and the imprisonment and exile of most of the family by Michael IV's minister John the Orphanotrophos. After the overthrow of Michael V in 1042, Constantine was again considered as a potential emperor by the Empress Zoe (r. 1028–1050); the Empress, however, saw Constantine as a man of austere principles and ultimately chose Constantine IX Monomachos (r. 1042–1055).

In the 1060s and 1070s, members of the family, whose relation to the magistros Damian and his sons is unclear, served primarily as senior generals in the Balkans, like the doux of Skopje Damian in 1073 or the doux of Thessalonica Theodore in circa 1062. The family became most notable, however, through the marriage of the ambitious and capable Anna Dalassene (the great-granddaughter, on her mother's side, of the magistros Damian), to John Komnenos, the younger brother of the general and future emperor Isaac I Komnenos (r. 1057–1059). Anna resolutely advanced her children's careers, until her son Alexios I Komnenos ascended the throne in 1081. During Alexios's frequent absences from Constantinople on campaign, she served as the regent of the Byzantine Empire.

== Later members ==
The admiral Constantine Dalassenos played a significant role in the early reign of Alexios I Komnenos, but most members of the family known thereafter are civil officials. The most prominent of the 12th-century Dalassenoi was John Dalassenos Rogerios, who was named Caesar circa 1138 and led an unsuccessful conspiracy against Manuel I Komnenos (r. 1143–1180).

The Dalassenos name remained prominent until the end of the 12th century, but declined thereafter, and in the later Empire the name appears only rarely, and then among lower levels of society.

== Sources ==
- Cheynet, Jean-Claude; Vannier, Jean-François (1986). Études Prosopographiques (in French). Paris, France: Publications de la Sorbonne. ISBN 978-2-85944-110-4.
- Kazhdan, Aleksandr Petrovich; Epstein, Ann Wharton (1985). Change in Byzantine Culture in the Eleventh and Twelfth Centuries. Berkeley and Los Angeles: University of California Press. ISBN 0-520-05129-7.
- Kazhdan, Alexander, ed. (1991). The Oxford Dictionary of Byzantium. Oxford and New York: Oxford University Press. ISBN 0-19-504652-8.
- Krsmanović, Bojana (11 September 2003). "Dalassenoi". Encyclopaedia of the Hellenic World, Asia Minor. Athens, Greece: Foundation of the Hellenic World.
