= Romanos Dalassenos =

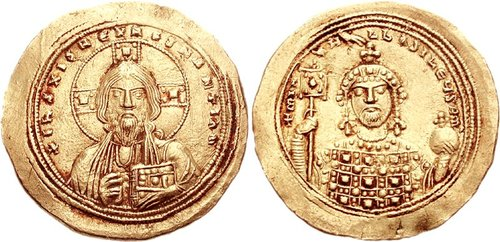
Romanos Dalassenos on coin

Romanos Dalassenos was a Byzantine aristocrat and governor of the province of Iberia.

== Life ==
Romanos was the son of Damian Dalassenos (killed 998), the first attested member of the distinguished Dalassenos aristocratic clan. He had two older brothers, Constantine Dalassenos and Theophylact Dalassenos.

Little is known about his life, with only a brief reference in the history of John Skylitzes and a few seals and an inscription on a gate in Theodosiopolis. From these sources it is known that he was protospatharios and katepano (senior military governor) of the large military province of Iberia. Nicholas Adontz estimated his tenure in that post in ca. 1023–26, while Werner Seibt placed it in 1031–34.

In 1039, along with the rest of the family, he was banished by Emperor Michael IV the Paphlagonian.

== Sources ==
- Kazhdan, Alexander, ed. (1991). The Oxford Dictionary of Byzantium. Oxford and New York: Oxford University Press. ISBN 0-19-504652-8.
- Lilie, Ralph-Johannes; Ludwig, Claudia; Pratsch, Thomas; Zielke, Beate (2013). Prosopographie der mittelbyzantinischen Zeit Online. Berlin-Brandenburgische Akademie der Wissenschaften. Nach Vorarbeiten F. Winkelmanns erstellt (in German). Berlin and Boston: De Gruyter.
