= Emperor Michael =

Emperor Michael may refer to:

- Nine Byzantine emperors
  - Michael I Rangabe (r. 811–813)
  - Michael II (r. 820–829)
  - Michael III (r. 842–867)
  - Michael IV the Paphlagonian (r. 1034–1041)
  - Michael V Kalaphates (r. 1041–1042)
  - Michael VI Bringas (r. 1056–1057)
  - Michael VII Doukas (r. 1071–1078)
  - Michael VIII Palaiologos (r. 1261–1282)
  - Michael IX Palaiologos (r. 1294–1320)
- Michael II Asen (r. 1246–1256), tsar of Bulgaria
- Michael Shishman of Bulgaria (r. 1323–1330), tsar of Bulgaria
- Michael of Russia (r. 1596–1645), tsar of Russia
