= Damian Dalassenos =

Byzantine general and aristocrat (c. 940–998)

Damian Dalassenos (Greek: Δαμιανός Δαλασσηνός; ca. 940 – 19 July 998) was a Byzantine aristocrat and the first known member of the Dalassenos noble family. He is known for his service as the military governor (doux) of Antioch in 996–998. He fought the Fatimids with some success, until he was killed at the Battle of Apamea on 19 July 998.

== Biography ==
Damian is the first attested member of the distinguished Dalassenos clan. His early life is unknown, but for genealogical reasons he is estimated to have been born in ca. 940. Nothing is known of him before 995/6, when Emperor Basil II appointed him governor of Antioch in succession to Michael Bourtzes following the latter's defeat in the Battle of the Orontes in September 994. This post was one of the most important military positions in the Byzantine Empire, as its holder commanded the forces arrayed against the Fatimid Caliphate and the semi-autonomous Muslim rulers of Syria. In this capacity, he held the high title of either patrikios (according to John Skylitzes) or magistros (according to Stephen of Taron).

Dalassenos maintained an aggressive stance. In 996 his forces raided the environs of Tripoli and Arqa, while Manjutakin, again without success, laid siege to Aleppo and Antartus, which the Byzantines had occupied and refortified the previous year, but was forced to withdraw when Dalassenos with his army came to relieve the fortress. The Fatimid defeat was compounded by the sinking of a Fatimid fleet, that was intended to support Manjutakin's operations, before Antartus. Dalassenos repeated his raids against Tripoli in 997, taking many captives. He also attacked the towns of Rafaniya, Awj, and Al-Laqbah, capturing the latter and carrying off its inhabitants into captivity.

In June/July 998, he marched his troops to Apamea to seize the city after a catastrophic fire had burned down its provisions. The Aleppines tried to seize the city first, but withdrew at the approach of Dalassenos, who could not permit a vassal to grow too strong. The local Fatimid governor, al-Mala'iti, called for aid, but the relief army under Jaysh ibn Samsama was delayed by having to deal first with suppressing the Byzantine-sponsored rebellion of Tyre. After Tyre had been subdued, Jaysh moved his army to Damascus, whence he proceeded to confront Dalassenos. Ibn al-Qalanisi reports that by this time, Apamea was near surrender due to famine. In the resulting battle, fought on 19 July 998, the Byzantines were initially victorious, but a Kurdish officer managed to kill Dalassenos, whereupon the Byzantine army collapsed and fled. Two of his sons, who accompanied Dalassenos, were taken captive to Cairo, where they remained for ten years, while Stephen of Taron somewhat dubiously reports that one of his sons was killed. Damian Dalassenos was succeeded as doux of Antioch by Nikephoros Ouranos.

== Family ==
Damian Dalassenos had at least three sons:

- Constantine Dalassenos, doux of Antioch in 1025 and a favourite of Emperor Constantine VIII (r. 1025–1028).
- Theophylact Dalassenos, also a doux of Antioch.
- Romanos Dalassenos, katepano of Iberia.

Theophylact was most likely the father of Adrianos, the maternal grandfather of Anna Dalassene, the mother of Emperor Alexios I Komnenos, founder of the Komnenian dynasty.

== Sources ==
- Cheynet, Jean-Claude; Vannier, Jean-François (1986). Études Prosopographiques (in French). Paris: Publications de la Sorbonne. ISBN 978-2-85944-110-4.
- Holmes, Catherine (2005). Basil II and the Governance of Empire (976–1025). Oxford: Oxford University Press. ISBN 978-0-19-927968-5.
- Honigmann, Ernst (1935). Byzance et les Arabes, Tome III: Die Ostgrenze des Byzantinischen Reiches von 363 bis 1071 nach griechischen, arabischen, syrischen und armenischen Quellen. Corpus Bruxellense Historiae Byzantinae (in German). Brussels: Éditions de l'Institut de philologie et d'histoire orientales. OCLC 6934222.
- Kazhdan, Alexander, ed. (1991). The Oxford Dictionary of Byzantium. Oxford and New York: Oxford University Press. ISBN 0-19-504652-8.
- Lilie, Ralph-Johannes; Ludwig, Claudia; Pratsch, Thomas; Zielke, Beate (2013). Prosopographie der mittelbyzantinischen Zeit Online. Berlin-Brandenburgische Akademie der Wissenschaften. Nach Vorarbeiten F. Winkelmanns erstellt (in German). Berlin and Boston: De Gruyter.
- Trombley, Frank (1997). "The Taktika of Nikephoros Ouranos and Military Encyclopaedism". In Binkley, Peter (ed.). Pre-Modern Encyclopaedic Texts: Proceedings of the Second COMERS Congress, Groningen, 1–4 July 1996. Leiden and New York: Brill. pp. 261–274. ISBN 978-90-04-10830-1.

| Preceded by Michael Bourtzes | Doux of Antioch; 996–998 | Succeeded by Nikephoros Ouranos |
