= Theophylact Dalassenos =

Theophylact Dalassenos (Greek: Θεοφύλακτος Δαλασσηνός; born before c. 990 – after 1039) was a Byzantine aristocrat who occupied a series of senior military positions in the 11th century.

== Life ==
Theophylact was the son of Damian Dalassenos, the first attested member of the distinguished Dalassenos aristocratic clan. He first appears in 998, when he accompanied his father, then holding the post of doux of Antioch, in battle against the Fatimids. In the resulting Battle of Apamea Damian was killed and Theophylact, along with his brother Constantine, were taken prisoner. They were then sold on to the Fatimid general Jaysh al-Samsama for 6,000 gold dinars, spending the next ten years in captivity in the Fatimid capital of Cairo.

Following his release he continued his military career, but his life is obscure until 1021/22, by which time, according to Yahya of Antioch, he held the rank of protospatharios and droungarios (most likely the post of droungarios tes viglas). In August 1022, Emperor Basil II (reigned 976–1025) appointed him strategos (military governor) of the Anatolic Theme and gave him money to raise troops, with the task of suppressing the rebellion of Nikephoros Xiphias and Nikephoros Phokas Barytrachelos. In the end, the two rebels fell out and Xiphias had Phokas assassinated; as the rebellion collapsed, Dalassenos took Xiphias prisoner and brought him for trial to Constantinople.

From his surviving seals of office, it is known that he further held the rank of the posts of katepano of Iberia (likely before 1021), and katepano of Vaspurakan (after 1027). His last post, likely in 1032–34, was that of doux of Antioch, with the ranks of anthypatos patrikios and vestes, also attested by a seal. Emperor Michael IV the Paphlagonian (r. 1034–41) however suspected the Dalassenoi of conspiring to usurp the throne; Theophylact's career therefore probably ended in 1034, and the entire family was banished in August 1039. Another seal records that he held the supreme court rank of magistros as well, but it is unclear whether this was already before 1034 or whether he was awarded it after Michael IV's death.

Theophylact was most likely the father of Adrianos, the maternal grandfather of Anna Dalassene, the mother of Emperor Alexios I Komnenos, founder of the Komnenian dynasty.

== Sources ==
- Cheynet, Jean-Claude; Vannier, Jean-François (1986). Études Prosopographiques (in French). Paris: Publications de la Sorbonne. ISBN 978-2-85944-110-4.
- Holmes, Catherine (2005). Basil II and the Governance of Empire (976–1025). Oxford: Oxford University Press. ISBN 978-0-19-927968-5.
- Kazhdan, Alexander, ed. (1991). The Oxford Dictionary of Byzantium. Oxford and New York: Oxford University Press. ISBN 0-19-504652-8.
- Lilie, Ralph-Johannes; Ludwig, Claudia; Pratsch, Thomas; Zielke, Beate (2013). Prosopographie der mittelbyzantinischen Zeit Online. Berlin-Brandenburgische Akademie der Wissenschaften. Nach Vorarbeiten F. Winkelmanns erstellt (in German). Berlin and Boston: De Gruyter.
