= Constantine Dalassenos (duke of Antioch) =

Byzantine aristocrat and general

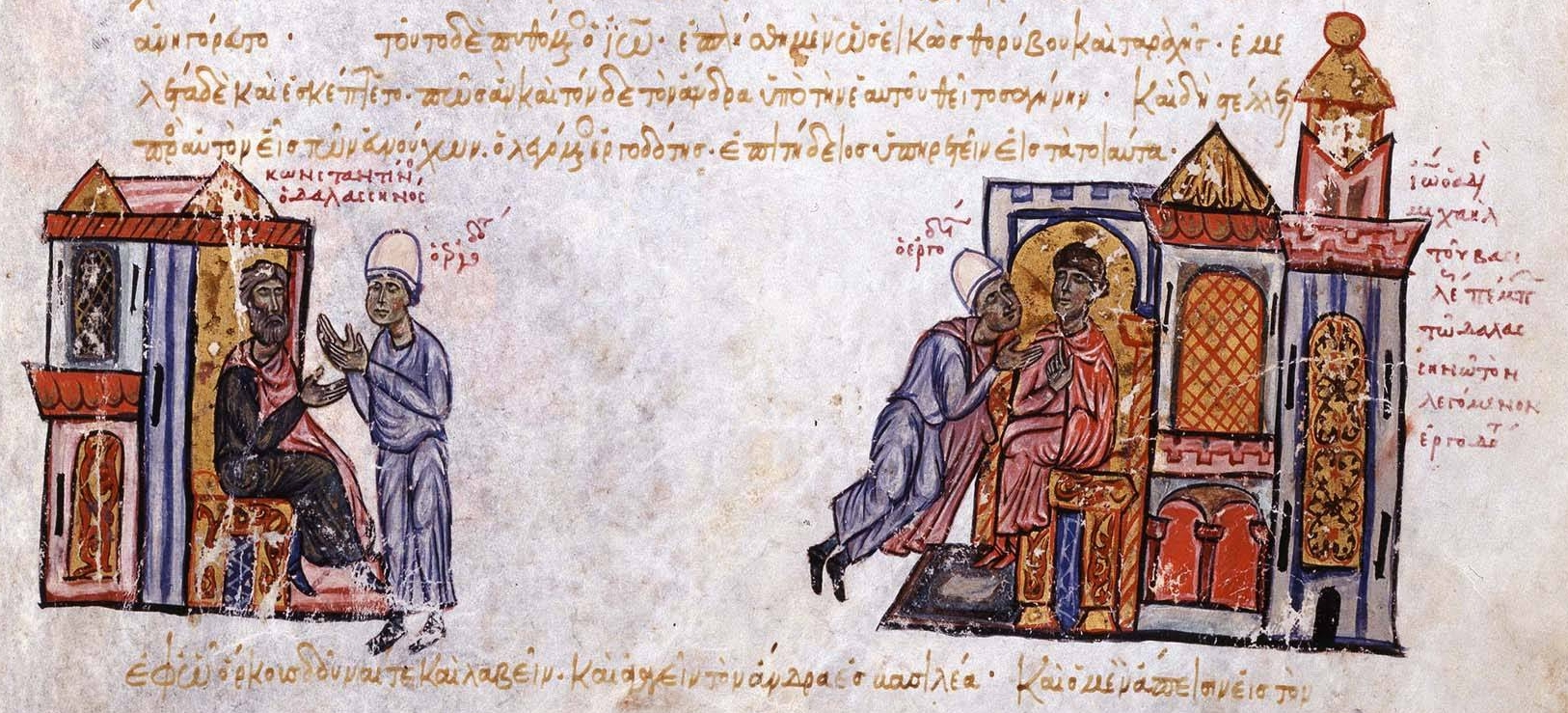
- John the Orphanotrophos sends Ergodotes to Constantine Dalassenos, miniature from the Madrid Skylitzes
- Born: c. 965 to 970
- Died: Unknown
- Military career
- Rank: Patrikios, doux of Antioch
- Conflicts: Battle of Azaz (1030)

Constantine Dalassenos (Greek: Κωνσταντίνος Δαλασσηνός, romanized: Kōnstantinos Dalassēnos) was a prominent Byzantine aristocrat of the first half of the 11th century. An experienced and popular general, he came close to ascending the imperial throne by marriage to the porphyrogenita Empress Zoe (r. 1028–1050) in 1028. He accompanied the man Zoe did marry, Emperor Romanos III Argyros (r. 1028–1034), on campaign and was blamed by some chroniclers for Romanos' humiliating defeat at the Battle of Azaz.

He suffered a long period of imprisonment under Michael IV the Paphlagonian (r. 1034–1041), who feared that Dalassenos plotted against him. When Michael's successor was deposed in 1042, Zoe invited Dalassenos to an audience with a view to marrying him and making him emperor; displeased by his haughty manner she chose a more pliant man, Constantine IX Monomachos.

== Biography ==
=== Early life ===
Constantine may have been born at some point between 965 and 970. He was the eldest son of the magistros Damian Dalassenos, who held the important post of doux of Antioch from 995 or 996 until his death in battle against the Fatimids at Apamea in 998. Constantine, with his brothers Romanos and Theophylact, was also present at the battle. He was probably one of the two sons of the magistros who, according to the Christian Arab historian Yahya of Antioch, were captured by the Fatimids, taken to Cairo, and ransomed only in 1008.

=== High rank ===
Constantine's career between 1008 and 1024 is unknown, but historians speculate he probably held a succession of military commands. He reappears in spring 1024, when he held his father's old post as doux of Antioch, with the rank of patrikios, the Empire's senior honorific title, which was limited to a small number of holders. He enjoyed the favour of Emperor Constantine VIII (r. 1025–1028). The Dalassenoi were one of the few powerful patrician families who had been unswervingly loyal to the Macedonian dynasty. On his deathbed, Constantine summoned Dalassenos to marry his oldest daughter Zoe. Constantine Dalassenos set out from his estates in the Armeniac Theme, but before reaching Constantinople the situation changed: the Emperor's advisors, who preferred a weak ruler whom they could control, had persuaded the dying Emperor to choose Romanos III Argyros instead. Dalassenos was ordered to return home.

Under Romanos III, Dalassenos served as a commander in the 1030 campaign against the Emir of Aleppo which concluded in the Battle of Azaz. After the Byzantine scouts were ambushed, Dalassenos led an attack against the Arabs, but was defeated, and fled back to the camp. That night Dalassenos took part in an imperial council at which the demoralised Byzantines resolved to abandon the campaign and return to Byzantine territory. Romanos also ordered his siege engines to be burned. On 10 August 1030 the army abandoned its camp and marched for Antioch. Discipline broke down in the Byzantine army, with Armenian mercenaries using the withdrawal as an opportunity to pillage the camp's stores. The Emir launched an attack and the imperial army broke and fled. Both Dalassenos and Romanos had close escapes during the rout; according to the chronicler Yahya, two senior commanders were killed and another captured. Arab sources and the chronicle of Matthew of Edessa blame Dalassenos and his conspiring against Romanos for the expedition's failure.

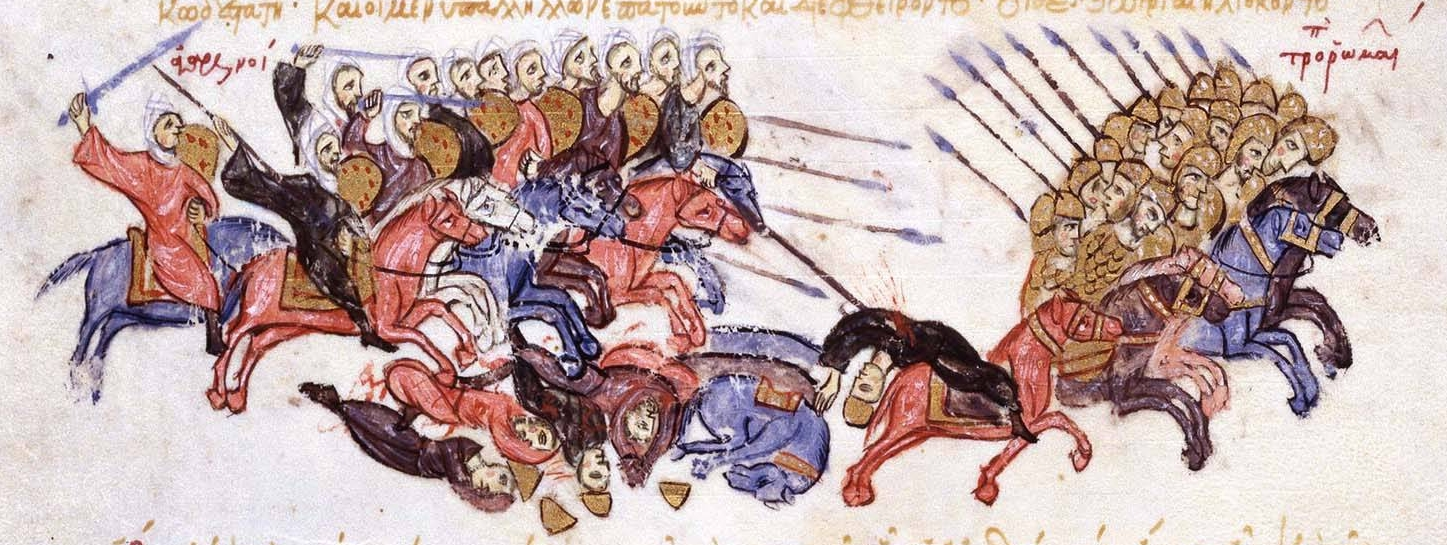
Arab cavalry pursue fleeing Byzantines after the Battle of Azaz, from the Madrid Skylitzes

During the reign of Argyros's successors, Michael IV the Paphlagonian (r. 1034–1041) and Michael V (r. 1041–1042), Dalassenos emerged as the leader of the aristocratic opposition. Several prominent Anatolian families, notably the powerful Doukai, supported him; the later emperor Constantine X Doukas (r. 1059–1067) was married to Dalassenos's daughter. According to historian Michael Psellos, Dalassenos also enjoyed strong support from the populace in Constantinople and especially in his old command, Antioch.

=== Fall ===
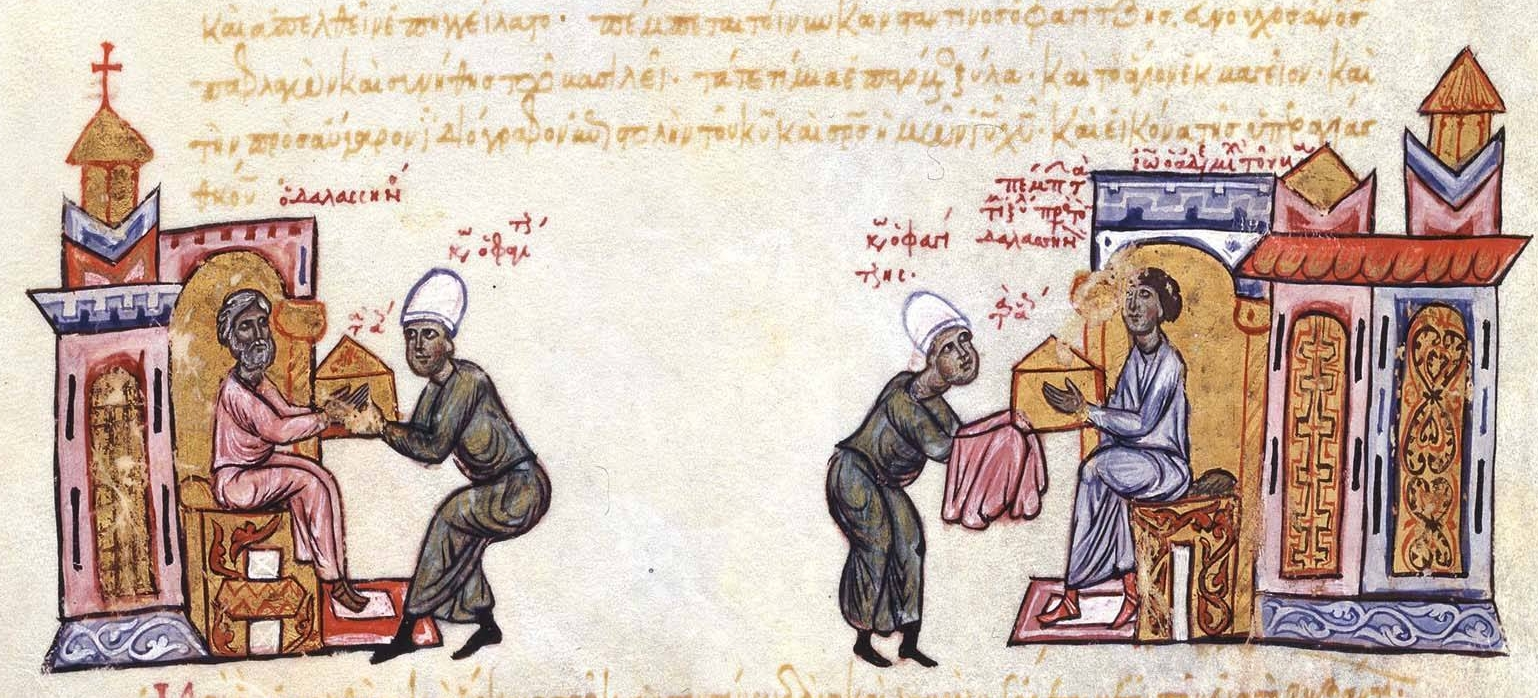
John the Orphanotrophos sends Phagitzes with relics to Constantine Dalassenos, miniature from the Madrid Skylitzes

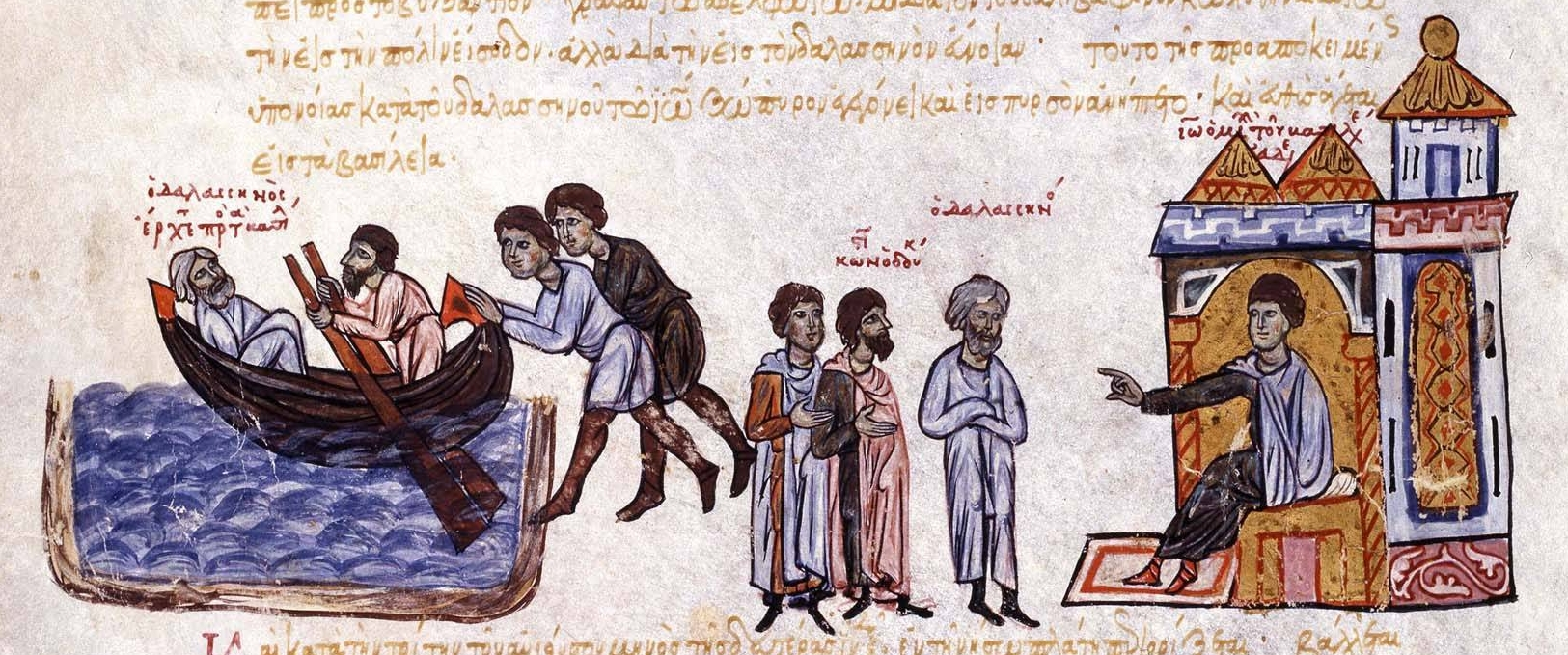
John the Orphanotrophos sends Constantine Dalassenos to exile at Plate Island, miniature from the Madrid Skylitzes

The accession of the low-born Michael IV reportedly enraged Dalassenos, who derided the new emperor as a vulgar and base-born. Consequently, Michael's eunuch brother and chief minister, John the Orphanotrophos, attempted to neutralise him. With the promise of titles and honours, he tried to lure Dalassenos from his estates in the Armeniac Theme to Constantinople. Dalassenos at first refused, but after receiving assurances for his safety, guaranteed by an oath on some of the Empire's holiest relics, he left for the imperial capital. Initially he was treated well, receiving a promotion and gifts, but in summer 1034 a revolt broke out in Antioch against the local governor, Michael IV's brother Niketas. The uprising was triggered by heavy taxation, but John the Orphanotrophos chose to blame it on the Dalassenoi: Constantine, his brothers and relatives and other nobles associated with them, including his son-in-law Constantine Doukas, were imprisoned or exiled.

Constantine himself was first exiled to an island in the Sea of Marmara, but later, to prevent his escape, he was transferred to a tower in the Walls of Constantinople, along with Constantine Doukas, the future emperor. His military expertise, however, continued to be so highly valued that John the Orphanotrophos considered sending him to his brother Constantine as a military advisor in a campaign against Abasgia. However, the emperor saw him as an arch-enemy and he remained imprisoned. A later tradition has it that during Dalassenos's detention in the capital, Zoe, who had yet to conceive a child, carried out a secret relationship with him in hopes of getting pregnant. At some point in 1041 Constantine was also forced to become a monk. The accounts here are contradictory: Psellos writes that Michael V did this upon his accession in December, but Michael Attaleiates, in contrast, records that Michael V had Dalassenos liberated from confinement.

=== Marriage proposal ===
After Michael V was deposed in a popular uprising in April 1042, Constantine VIII's daughters Zoe and Theodora were left as de facto rulers of the Byzantine Empire. Following both custom and her own inclination, Zoe decided to choose another husband (her third), who would also become the new emperor. The elderly but still handsome Constantine Dalassenos, who had almost become her first husband in 1028, was her first choice. He was brought for an audience before the Empress, but during their conversation his independent and forceful manner displeased Zoe, and he was passed over in favour of the more pliant and amenable Constantine Artoklines, with whom Zoe was rumoured to have dallied a decade earlier. Artoklines' wife poisoned him before he could divorce her; Zoe married a third good-looking Constantine, Constantine Monomachos, who reigned as Constantine IX (r. 1042–1055). Constantine Dalassenos disappears thereafter from the sources.

== Bibliography ==
- Cheynet, Jean-Claude; Vannier, Jean-François (1986). Études Prosopographiques (in French). Paris: Publications de la Sorbonne. ISBN 978-2-85944-110-4.
- Kazhdan, Alexander, ed. (1991). The Oxford Dictionary of Byzantium. Oxford and New York: Oxford University Press. ISBN 0-19-504652-8.
- Kazhdan, Alexander; Epstein, Ann Wharton (1985). Change in Byzantine Culture in the Eleventh and Twelfth Centuries. Berkeley and Los Angeles, California: University of California Press. ISBN 978-0-520-05129-4.
- Krsmanović, Bojana (11 September 2003). "Dalassenoi". Encyclopaedia of the Hellenic World, Asia Minor. Athens: Foundation of the Hellenic World. Archived from the original on 9 October 2011.
- Norwich, John (1991). Byzantium: The Apogee. London: Penguin. ISBN 978-0-670-80252-4.
- Patlagean, Évelyne (2007). Un Moyen Âge grec: Byzance, IXe–XVe siècle (in French). Paris: Albin Michel. ISBN 978-2-226-17110-8.
- Treadgold, Warren (1997). A History of the Byzantine State and Society. Stanford, California: Stanford University Press. ISBN 0-8047-2630-2.
- Wortley, John, ed. (2010). John Skylitzes: A Synopsis of Byzantine History, 811–1057. Cambridge: Cambridge University Press. ISBN 978-0-521-76705-7.
- Zakkar, Suhayl (1971). The Emirate of Aleppo: 1004–1094. Aleppo: Dar al-Amanah. OCLC 977126570.

Unknown Last known title holder: Michael the koitonites (1011)	Doux of Antioch; 1024–1025	Succeeded by Michael Spondyles
