= Roger (son of Dagobert) =

Roger, the son of Dagobert (Greek: Ῥογέρης/Ῥογέριος ὁ τοῦ Τακουπέρτου), was a Norman magnate who deserted to the Byzantine Empire where he entered the service of Emperor Alexios I Komnenos (r. 1081–1118). He is the founder of the noble Byzantine family of Rogerios.

== Biography ==
Roger was a Norman magnate and companion of Robert Guiscard, alongside whom he took part in the Norman conquest of southern Italy. In 1080/1081, however, as Robert Guiscard was preparing to cross the Adriatic and invade the Byzantine Empire, Roger defected to the Byzantines and informed their emperor, Alexios I Komnenos, of the Norman preparations. Roger's flight also forced his brother, Raoul, to seek refuge in the Byzantine court as well. He became the ancestor of the Raoul/Ralles family.

Both Anna Komnene, in her Alexiad, and Nicholas Kallikles, in a eulogy written for Roger's funeral, relate Roger's subsequent career under Alexios: receiving the rank of sebastos, he fought with the emperor against the Pechenegs and the Seljuk Turks, as well as against the Normans. In 1098, he served along with his brother Raoul as ambassadors to Godfrey of Bouillon, and during Bohemond's invasion of the Balkans in 1108 he was used as an envoy and hostage during the negotiations between the Normans and the Empire. Later, he was also one of the signatories of the Treaty of Devol which ended hostilities between Bohemond and Byzantium.

Both Byzantine and Western chroniclers praised Roger for his bravery and for his eloquence.

=== Family ===
Roger married an unknown lady of the Dalassenos family, which was closely tied to the imperial Komnenos dynasty. He had at least one confirmed son, the Caesar John Rogerios Dalassenos. Another member of the family, the sebastos Constantine Rogerios, was a contemporary of John Rogerios and served under Emperor John II Komnenos (r. 1118–1143), but his precise relation to Roger is unknown.

== Sources ==
- Kazhdan, Alexander, ed. (1991). The Oxford Dictionary of Byzantium. Oxford and New York: Oxford University Press. ISBN 0-19-504652-8.
- Skoulatos, Basile (1980). Les personnages byzantins de l'Alexiade: Analyse prosopographique et synthèse [The Byzantine Personalities of the Alexiad: Prosopographical Analysis and Synthesis] (in French). Louvain-la-Neuve and Louvain: Bureau du Recueil Collège Érasme and Éditions Nauwelaerts. OCLC 8468871.
