= Romanos III Argyros =

Byzantine emperor from 1028 to 1034

- Emperor and Autocrat of the Romans
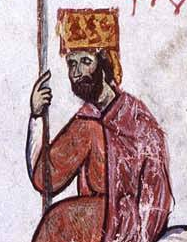
- Romanos III, 11th-century depiction from the Madrid Skylitzes

Byzantine emperor
- Reign: 12 November 1028 – 11 April 1034
- Coronation: 15 November 1028
- Predecessor: Constantine VIII
- Successor: Michael IV
- Augusta: Zoe
- Born: 968; Hierapolis, Thracesian Theme, Byzantine Empire
- Died: 11 April 1034 (aged 65–66); Constantinople, Byzantine Empire
- Spouse: Helena (Note: To avoid her husband Romanos III losing his eyes, Helena retired to a convent under the monastic name of Maria. Romanos III gave her the title of sebaste, the Greek for augusta, and made extravagant charitable donations on her death.); Zoë Porphyrogenita
- Issue: by Helena; A daughter
- Family: Argyros (by birth)
- Dynasty: Macedonian (by marriage)
- Father: Marianos Argyros

Romanos III Argyros (Greek: Ῥωμανός Ἀργυρός, romanized: Rōmanos Argyros; Latinized Romanus III Argyrus; 968 – 11 April 1034), or Argyropoulos, was Byzantine Emperor from 1028 until his death in 1034. He was a Byzantine noble and senior official in Constantinople when the dying Constantine VIII forced him to divorce his wife and marry the emperor's daughter, Zoë. Upon Constantine's death three days later, Romanos took the throne.

Romanos has been recorded as a well-meaning but ineffective emperor. He disorganised the tax system and undermined the military, personally leading a disastrous military expedition against Aleppo. He fell out with his wife and foiled several attempts on his throne, including two which revolved around his sister-in-law Theodora. He spent large amounts on the construction and repair of churches and monasteries. He died after six years on the throne, allegedly murdered, and was succeeded by his wife's young lover, Michael IV.

== Life ==
=== Family and early career ===
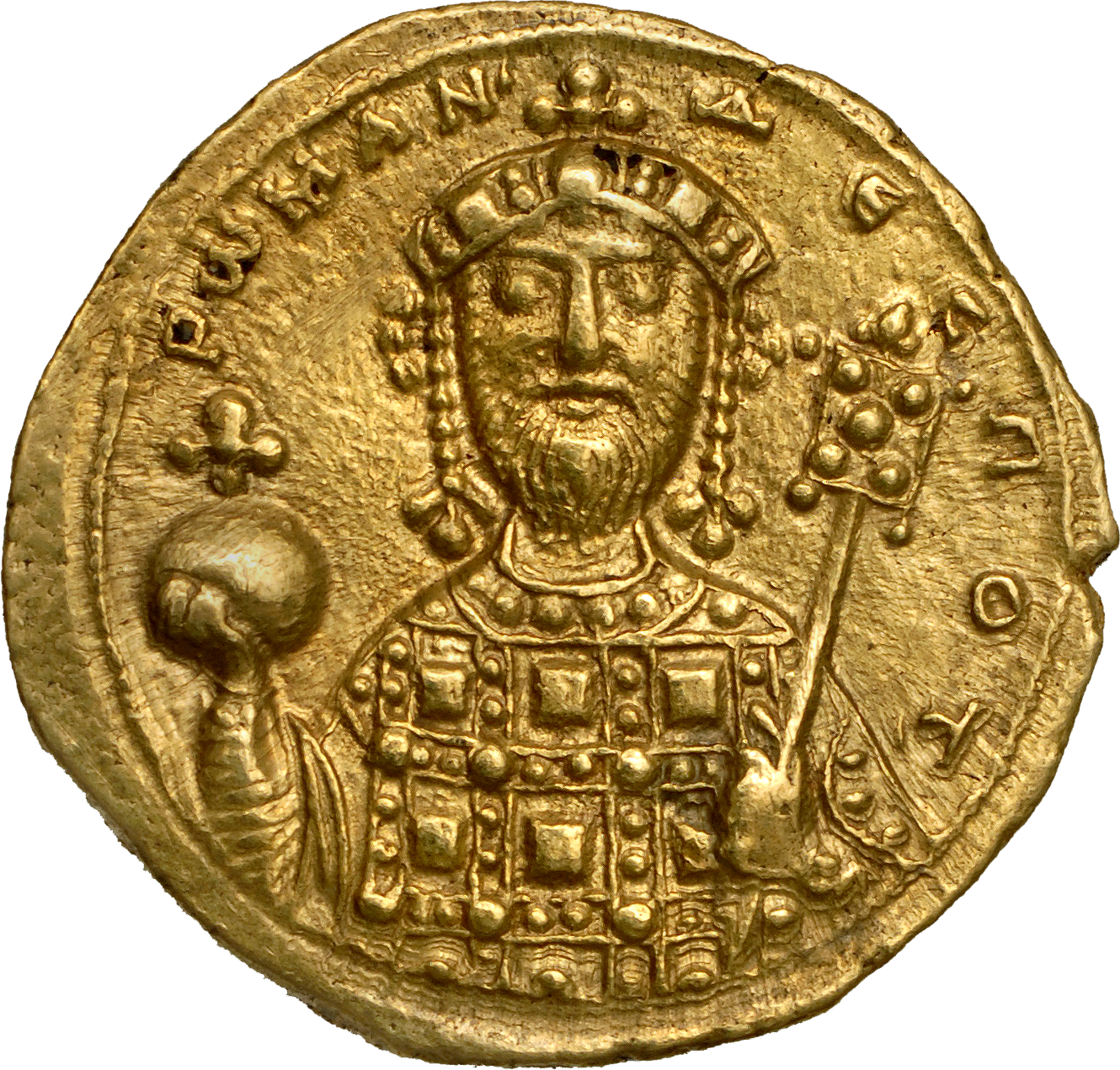
Tetarteron of Romanos III.

Romanos Argyros, born in 968, was the son of Marianos, a member of the Argyros family. Other hypotheses about his father are Pothos Argyros who defeated a Magyar raid in 958 (identified by some scholars with an older namesake), or Eustathios Argyros, known only for commissioning a poem in honour of Romanos II in 950. Romanos' father, Marianos, was the son of another Romanos Argyros, who had married Agatha, a daughter of Emperor Romanos I Lekapenos (r. 919–944).

Romanos had several siblings: Basil Argyros, who served as general and governor under Basil II (r. 976–1025); Leo, who served under Basil and was killed in Italy in 1017; Pulcheria Argyropoulina, who married the magistros Basil Skleros and was reportedly a "woman of great spirit...who contributed not a little to her brother's success" by helping him to control Zoe's spending; a sister who married Constantine Karantenos, who served as doux of Antioch under Romanos; and Maria Argyropoulina, who married Giovanni Orseolo, son of Doge Pietro II Orseolo.

He served as krites (judge) in Opsikion, with the rank of protospatharios (one of the highest judicial ranks, usually awarded to senior generals and provincial governors). In this capacity he persecuted heretics at Akmoneia. He was then promoted to the post of quaestor (the senior judicial official for the imperial capital, Constantinople) and became one of the judges of the Hippodrome, the High Court of the Empire. In this role he is mentioned in the Peira, a compendium of legal decisions compiled by the noted jurist Eustathios Rhomaios. He was promoted further to the rank of patrikios and the post of oikonomos (administrator) of the Great Church, while continuing to preside over the High Court. Under Emperor Constantine VIII he held the post of urban prefect of Constantinople, which made him the formal head of the Senate and one of the emperor's chief lieutenants.

=== Reign ===
Late in 1028, Constantine VIII lay on his deathbed. Wishing to secure the Macedonian dynasty, but having no son, he summoned Constantine Dalassenos from Antioch to marry his oldest daughter, Zoë. Dalassenos, the doux of Antioch, was an experienced military commander, influential patrician, and unswervingly loyal to the ruling house. The emperor's advisors preferred not to have a strong military figure as the new emperor, and persuaded the Emperor to choose Romanos instead, as a potentially more pliable and certainly less travelled candidate. Constantine VIII forced Romanos to divorce his wife Helena, who was sent to a monastery, and to marry Zoë, aged 50 at the time; Romanos was 60. The marriage took place on 9 November 1028, and on the same ceremony Romanos was proclaimed caesar. Three days later, on 11 November, Constantine died of illness. (Note: Some sources give 11 November.)

The new emperor was eager to make his mark as a ruler, but was mostly ineffectual in his enterprises. He idealised Marcus Aurelius, aspiring to be a new philosopher king, and similarly sought to imitate the military prowess of Trajan. He spent large sums on new buildings and in endowing churches and monasteries. He endeavoured to relieve the pressure of taxation on the aristocracy, which undermined the finances of the state. Previous emperors had attempted to control the privileges of the nobles over the common people. Coming from the aristocracy himself, Romanos III abandoned this policy. This failure to stand up to the aristocrats allowed them to exploit the rural mass of landed peasantry, who increasingly fell into a condition of serfdom. This in turn undermined the traditional recruiting base of the Byzantine army. The combination of a reduced tax base and fewer native-born troops had long-term consequences. As revenue declined, the subsequent impoverishment of the state weakened the military's recruitment power still further.

In 1030 he resolved to lead an army in person against the Mirdasids of Aleppo, despite their having accepted the Byzantines as overlords, with disastrous results. The army camped at a waterless site and its scouts were ambushed. An attack by the Byzantine cavalry was defeated. That night Romanos held an imperial council at which the demoralised Byzantines resolved to abandon the campaign and return to Byzantine territory. Romanos also ordered his siege engines to be burned. On 10 August 1030 the army departed its camp and made for Antioch. Discipline broke down in the Byzantine army, with Armenian mercenaries using the withdrawal as an opportunity to pillage the camp's stores. The Emir of Aleppo launched an attack and the imperial army broke and fled. Only the imperial bodyguard, the Hetaireia, held firm, but Romanos was nearly captured. Accounts vary on the battle losses: John Skylitzes wrote that the Byzantines suffered a "terrible rout" and that some troops were killed in a chaotic stampede by their fellow soldiers, Yahya of Antioch wrote that the Byzantines suffered remarkably few casualties. According to Yahya, two high ranking Byzantine officers were among the fatalities, and another officer was captured by the Arabs. After this defeat the army became a "laughing-stock".

Despite his victory, the Emir of Aleppo opened negotiations and signed a treaty that made Aleppo an Imperial tributary and allowed for a Greek governor to preside over the city. In 1032 the capture and successful defence of Edessa by George Maniakes and the sound defeat of a Saracen fleet in the Adriatic did little to restore Romanos' early popularity.

Romanos faced several conspiracies, mostly centred on his sister-in-law Theodora. In 1029 she planned to marry the Bulgarian prince Presian and to usurp the throne. The plot was discovered, Presian was blinded and tonsured as a monk but Theodora was not punished. In 1031 she was implicated in another conspiracy, this time with Constantine Diogenes, the Archon of Sirmium, and was forcibly confined in the monastery of Petrion.

In a vain attempt to reduce expenditure, Romanos limited his wife's expenses, which merely exacerbated the alienation between the two. Romanos took a mistress. Zoë in turn fell in love with Michael, the brother of high-ranking court eunuch John the Orphanotrophos. Romanos, unaware, allowed Michael to become one of his personal servants. Having survived the attempts on his throne by Theodora, his death on 11 April 1034 was supposed to have been due to poison administered by his wife. There is also speculation that he was drowned in a bath on his wife's orders. He was buried in the Church of St. Mary Peribleptos, which he built.

Zoë and Michael were married on the same day that Romanos III died. The next day the couple summoned the Patriarch Alexios I to officiate in the coronation of the new emperor. Although he initially refused to co-operate, the payment of 50 pounds of gold helped change his mind. He proceeded to crown Michael IV as the new emperor of the Romans.

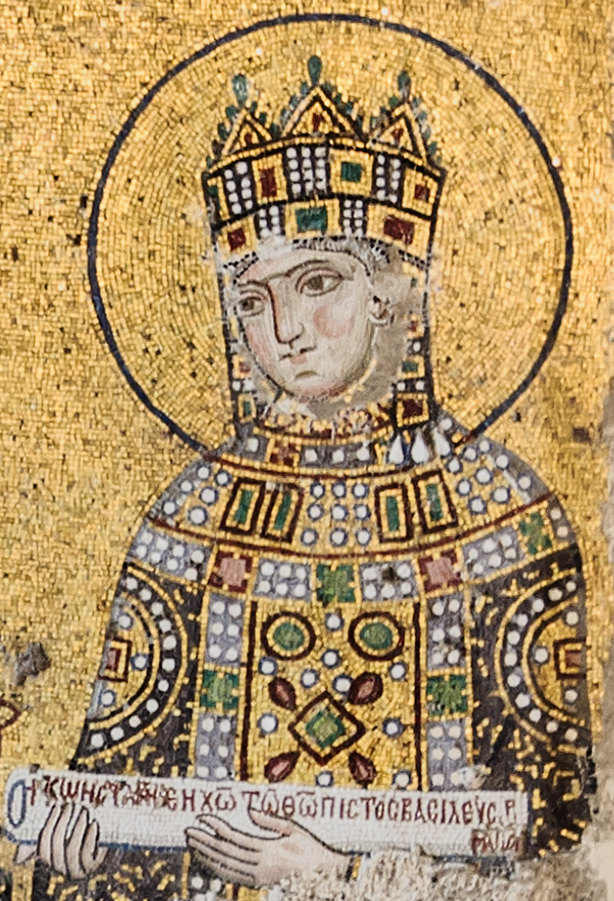
Mosaic of Zoë at the Hagia Sophia. (Note: Zoë's mosaic originally portrayed her alongside Romanos III, but was later reworked to portray Constantine IX Monomachos.)

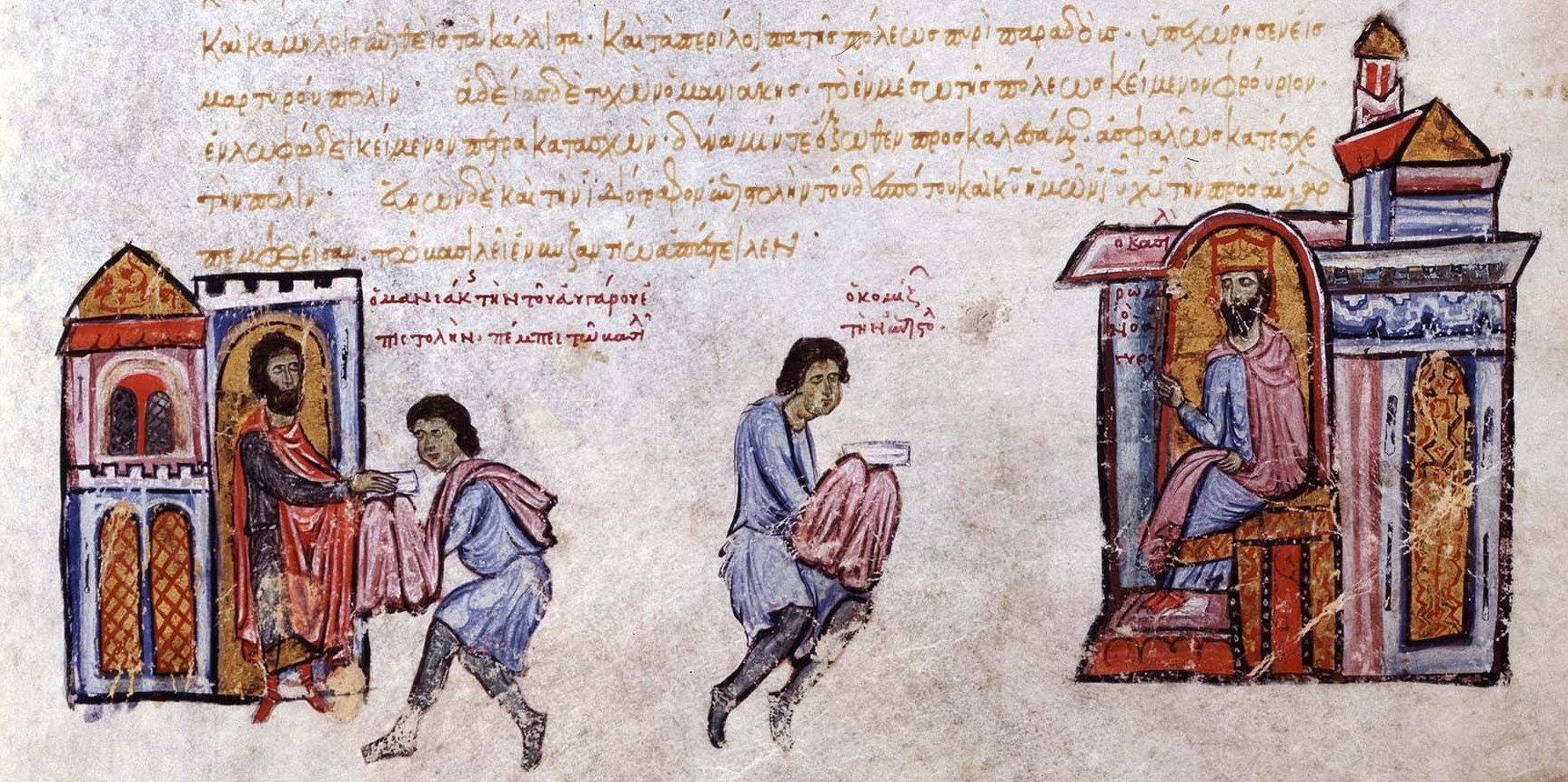
George Maniakes sends the letter of Christ to Romanos III.

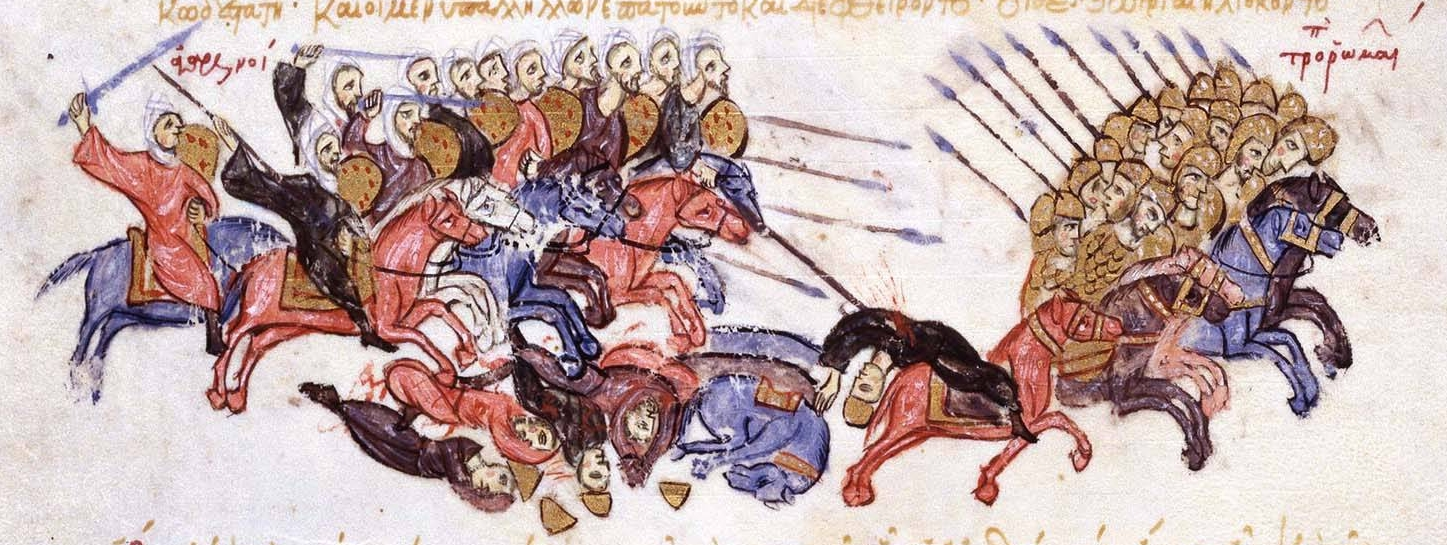
Arab cavalry pursue fleeing Byzantines after the Battle of Azaz.

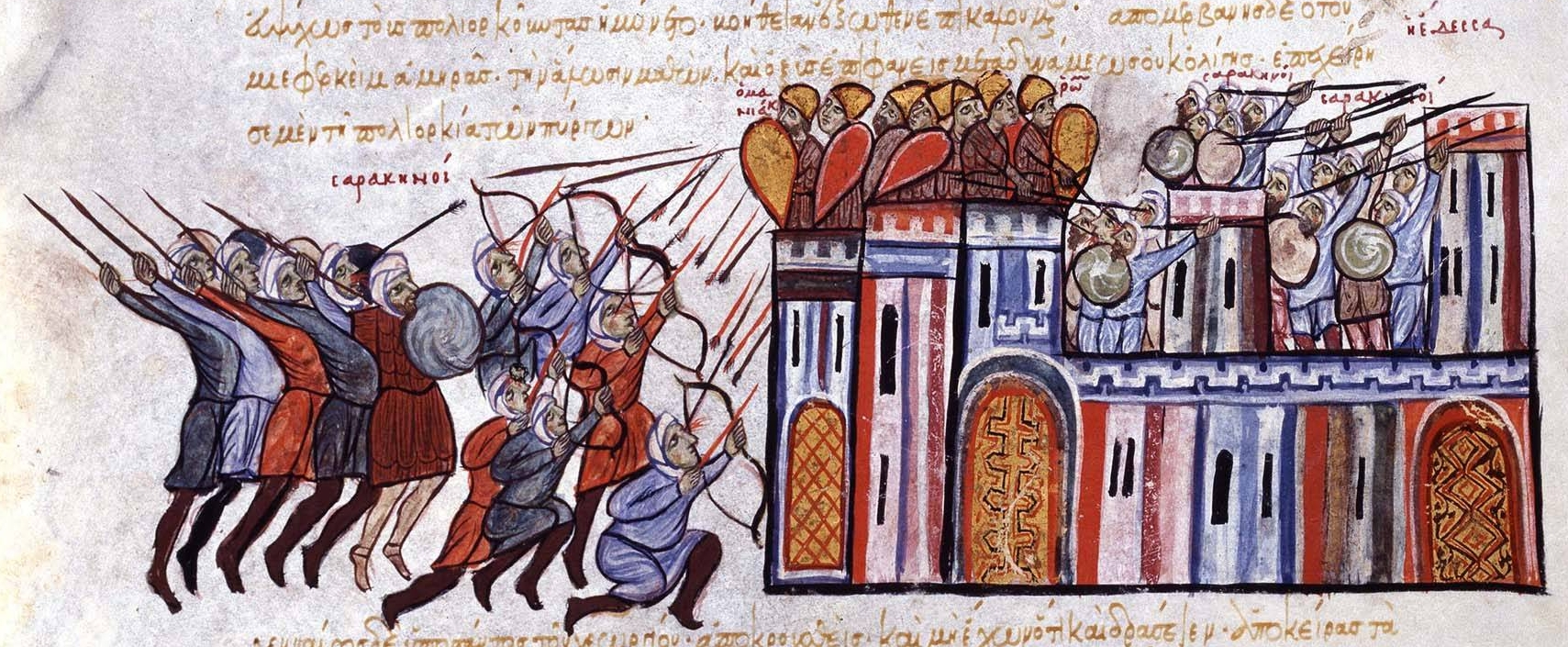
After capturing Edessa, the army under George Maniakes defends the city from a counter-attack by the Saracens.

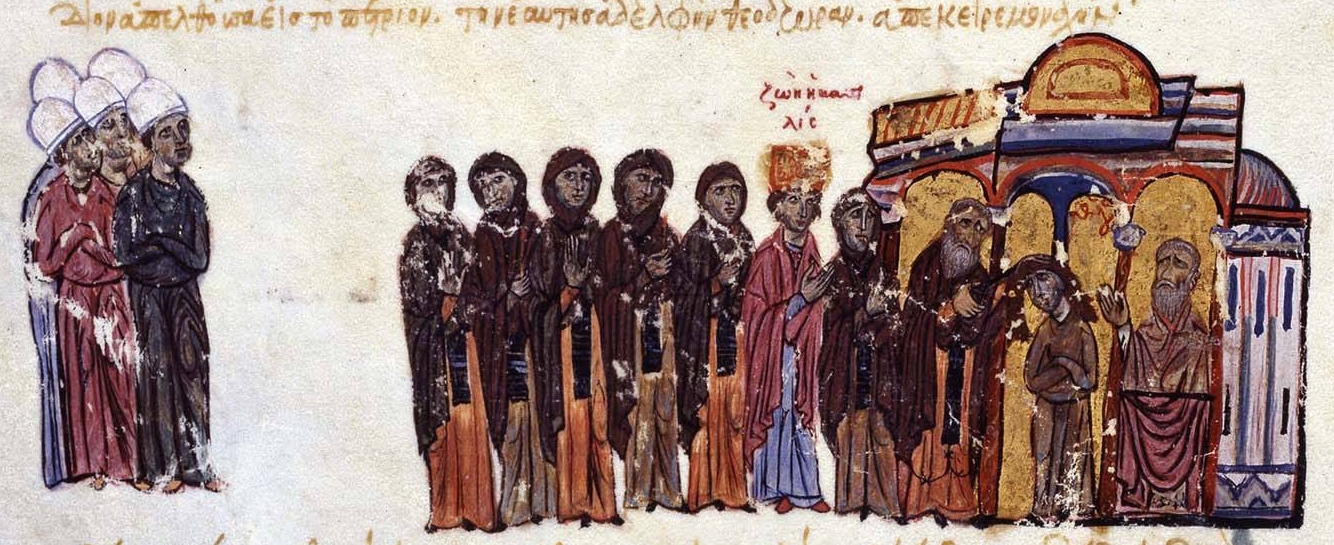
Empress Zoe tonsures Theodora after another failed conspiracy.

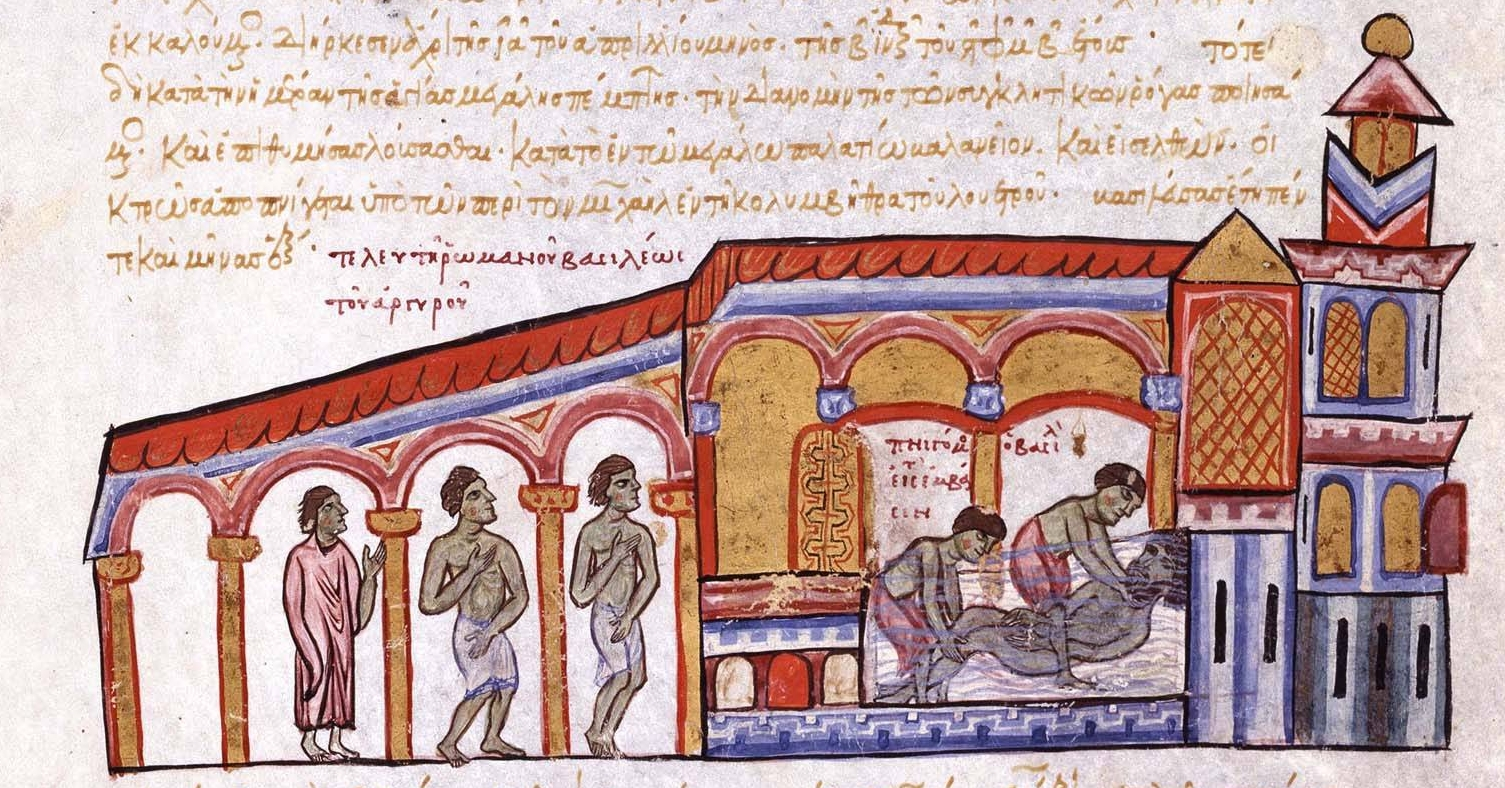
The murder of Romanos III Argyros in a bath, from the Chronicle of John Skylitzes.

== See also ==
- List of Byzantine emperors

== Sources ==
- Angold, Michael (2004). "The Byzantine Empire, 1025–1118". In Luscombe, David; Riley-Smith, Jonathan (eds.). The New Cambridge Medieval History, Volume 4, c.1024–c.1198, Part 2. Cambridge: Cambridge University Press. pp. 217–253. ISBN 978-1-13905403-4.
- Cheynet, J.-C.; Vannier, J.-F. (2003). "Les Argyroi". Zbornik Radova Vizantološkog Instituta (in French). 40: 57–90. doi:10.2298/ZRVI0340057C. ISSN 0584-9888.
- This article incorporates text from a publication now in the public domain: Chisholm, Hugh, ed. (1911). "Romanus". Encyclopædia Britannica. Vol. 23 (11th ed.). Cambridge University Press. pp. 583–584.
- Duggan, Anne J., ed. (2002) [1997]. Queens and Queenship in Medieval Europe. Rochester: The Boydell Press. ISBN 978-0-85115-657-6.
- Finlay, George (1853). History of the Byzantine Empire: from 716 to 1057. Edinburgh. OCLC 906577940.
- Garland, Lynda (1999). Byzantine Empresses: Women and Power in Byzantium AD 527–1204. London & New York: Routledge. ISBN 978-0-415-61944-8.
- Norwich, John (1991). Byzantium: the Apogee. London: Penguin. ISBN 978-0-670-80252-4.
- Ostrogorsky, George (1957). History of the Byzantine State. Translated by Hussey, Joan. New Brunswick: Rutgers University Press. OCLC 2221721.
- Ostrogorsky, George (1969) [1957]. History of the Byzantine State. Translated by Hussey, Joan. New Brunswick: Rutgers University Press. ISBN 978-0-8135-0599-2.
- Patlagean, Évelyne (2007). Un Moyen Âge Grec: Byzance, IXe–XVe siècle (in French). Paris: Albin Michel. ISBN 978-2-226-17110-8.
- Sewter, Edgar Robert Ashton, ed. (1966). The Chronographia of Michael Psellus. New Haven, Connecticut: Yale University Press. OCLC 314287374.
- Shepard, J. (2010). "Battle of Azaz". In Rogers, Clifford J. (ed.). The Oxford Encyclopedia of Medieval Warfare and Military Technology. Vol. 1. Oxford University Press. p. 102. ISBN 978-0-19-533403-6.
- Stevenson, William B. (1968). Tanner, J.R.; Previte-Orton, C.W.; Brooke, Z.N. (eds.). The Cambridge Medieval History. Vol. V. Cambridge University Press. OCLC 1001099260.
- Treadgold, Warren (1997). A History of the Byzantine State and Society. Stanford, California: Stanford University Press. ISBN 0-8047-2630-2.
- Wortley, John, ed. (2010). John Skylitzes: A Synopsis of Byzantine History, 811–1057. Cambridge: Cambridge University Press. ISBN 978-0-521-76705-7.
- Zakkar, Suhayl (1971). The Emirate of Aleppo: 1004–1094. Aleppo: Dar al-Amanah. OCLC 977126570.
- Kazhdan, Alexander, ed. (1991), "Romanos III Argyros", Oxford Dictionary of Byzantium, p. 1807, ISBN 978-0-19-504652-6

Romanos III Argyros Macedonian dynasty Born: 968 Died: 11 April 1034
Regnal titles
Preceded by Constantine VIII	Byzantine emperor 12 November 1028 – 11 April 1034	Succeeded by Michael IV
