= Serblias family =

Byzantine family

The Serblias family (Greek: Σερβλίας) was a Byzantine family that was active between the 11th and 13th centuries, employed in civil service in the central and provincial government. A part of the family was related to the Spanopouloi in the 1090s. The etymology of the name derives from their origin, either Serbia (Σερβλία), or the fortress town of Servia (τὰ Σἐρβλια). Contemporarily, the family used its name as an argument to claim descent from the ancient Servilia gens. Writing a letter to one Nikephoros Serblias, John Tzetzes addressed him as "descendant of the Servilian Caesars" (ὁ Σερβιλίων Καισάρων ἀπόγονος).

== People ==
Members recorded in Byzantine Sigillography:

- Peter, son of Serblias (c. 1025–50).
- Michael Serblias (fl. 1029), protospatharios of the Chrysotriklinos and krites of Thessaloniki; or krites of Boleron, Strymon and Thessaloniki.
- Stephanos Serblias (1040/70), protospatharios and tax official (kommerkiarios) of Longibardia, possibly also mystographos.
- Leon Serblias (1040/80), magistros. Constantine IX Monomachos' envoy to Iberia.
- Peter Serblias (c. 1050–75), magistros.
- Nicholas Serblias (fl. 1060–62), krites of the Hippodrome and of the velon (1060); kensor and megas kourator of Tarsos and Seleukeia (c. 1060–62); hypatos, krites of the Hippodrome, of the velon, of Boleron, Strymon and Thessalonica (August 1062).
- John Serblias (c. 1066–early 12th century), two seals with that name without titles, possibly two persons.
- John Serblias (c. 1066–beginning of 12th century), deputy of inspection.
- Michael Serblias (c. 1066–beginning of 12th century), no title.
- Anthimos Serblias (unknown), krites.
- Nikephoros Serblias (c. 1100–1166), krites.
- John Serblias (1106), imperial notarios of the genikon. Possibly the homonymous deputy of inspection.
- Nikephoros Serblias (1140), mystikos. Possibly the homonymous krites.
- [Anonymous] Serblias (1146), krites. The period suggests a possible identity with Nikephoros Serblias the mystikos or the krites.
- Basil Serblias (1143–80), no title. A close relative of John.
- John Serblias (1143–80), no title.
- Nikephoros Serblias (2nd half of 12th century), no title.
- George Serblias (1200–1266), praitor of Thrace and Macedonia.

== Sources ==
- Wassiliou-Seibt, Alexandra-Kyriaki (2012). "Der Familienname Serblias und seine Träger in Byzanz. Eine prosopographisch-sigillographische Studie". In Cheynet, Jean-Claude; Sode, Claudia (eds.). Studies in Byzantine Sigillography (in German). Walter de Gruyter. pp. 35–55. ISBN 978-3-11-027114-0.
- Gkoutzioukostas, Andreas. "Judges of the velum and judges of the hippodrome in Thessalonike". Byzantine Symmeikta. 20: 67–84. doi:10.12681/byzsym.970.
- Leidholm, Nathan (2018). "Nikephoros III Botaneiates, the Phokades, and the Fabii: embellished genealogies and contested kinship in eleventh-century Byzantium". Byzantine and Modern Greek Studies. 42 (2). Cambridge University Press: 185–201. doi:10.1017/byz.2018.4. ISSN 0307-0131. S2CID 165391827.
- McGeer, Eric; Nesbitt, John; Oikonomides, Nicolas, eds. (2005). Catalogue of Byzantine Seals at Dumbarton Oaks and in the Fogg Museum of Art, Volume 5: The East (continued), Constantinople and Environs, Unknown Locations, Addenda, Uncertain Readings. Washington, DC: Dumbarton Oaks Research Library and Collection. pp. 16, 171, 173, 176, 183. ISBN 0-88402-309-5.
