= John Rogerios Dalassenos =

Byzantine aristocrat of Norman descent

John Roger or Rogerios (Greek: Ιωάννης Ρογέριος), also known as John Dalassenos (Greek: Ιωάννης Δαλασσηνός), was a Byzantine aristocrat of Norman descent, son-in-law of Byzantine emperor John II Komnenos (r. 1118–1143) and Caesar. In 1143, he unsuccessfully conspired to seize the throne.

== Biography ==
John Rogerios was the son of a certain Roger, a Norman who defected to Byzantium during the Byzantine–Norman wars and entered imperial service, and of an unnamed lady of the Dalassenos clan. John himself evidently preferred to use the more prestigious surname of his mother's family, which is found on his seal, but historians, from John Kinnamos to modern scholars, most often use his Norman patronymic.

Through his Dalassenoi blood, Roger was already a relative of the ruling Komnenos dynasty, and this link was reinforced when he married John II's eldest daughter Maria and was raised to the rank of caesar. His life is otherwise obscure until 1143, when, on the death of John II, he plotted to usurp the throne from Manuel I Komnenos (r. 1143–1180). He enjoyed some support within the nobility, above all among the various Normans in the imperial capital, most prominent of whom was the exiled prince of Capua, Robert II. His wife, however, loyal to her brother, reported the conspiracy, whereupon John was tricked into leaving the capital and taken prisoner.

John was soon forgiven and restored to his position, at about the time Maria died in circa 1146, as he is recorded as participating in a synod at the Blachernae Palace in February 1147. In 1152, he is recorded as a governor at Strumica in the upper Vardar river valley. In the same year, he was sent to Antioch as an imperial candidate for the hand of the widowed Princess Constance of Antioch. Despite his lofty title and Norman ancestry, Constance found him too old and unattractive, and rejected him in favour of Reynald of Châtillon.

John returned to the Empire and retired to a monastery, where he died at an unknown date (possibly after 1166).

=== Family ===
By his marriage with Maria, John had four children:

- Andronikos Komnenos (died 1191).
- Alexios Komnenos.
- Anna Komnene, who married the general Alexios Petraliphas.
- Theodora Komnene (unascertained), who married John Kontostephanos, brother of the megas doux Andronikos Kontostephanos.

== Sources ==
- Kazhdan, Alexander, ed. (1991). The Oxford Dictionary of Byzantium. Oxford and New York: Oxford University Press. ISBN 0-19-504652-8.
- Magdalino, Paul (2002) [1993]. The Empire of Manuel I Komnenos, 1143–1180. Cambridge: Cambridge University Press. ISBN 0-521-52653-1.
