= Aerikon =

Tax levy (or fine) in the Byzantine Empire

Aerikon [aerikón] or air tax was a tax levy (or fine) in the Byzantine Empire. It is estimated that initially it was an additional tax paid annually in cash (but probably in kind in the 9th/10th century), while in the 10th and 11th centuries it took the form of a tax on cattle, the payment of which was undertaken in total by each village.

Procopius of Caesarea is the first to mention aerikon, reporting that it was imposed by the emperor Justinian I as an additional annual tax. According to Franz Delger, its name comes from a fine for breaking laws related to the minimum distance that had to be maintained between buildings in cities. In the "Tacticals" of Leonos V it is said that the soldiers had to pay the aerikon separately from the regular taxation.
