= John the Orphanotrophos =

Court eunuch in the Byzantine Empire

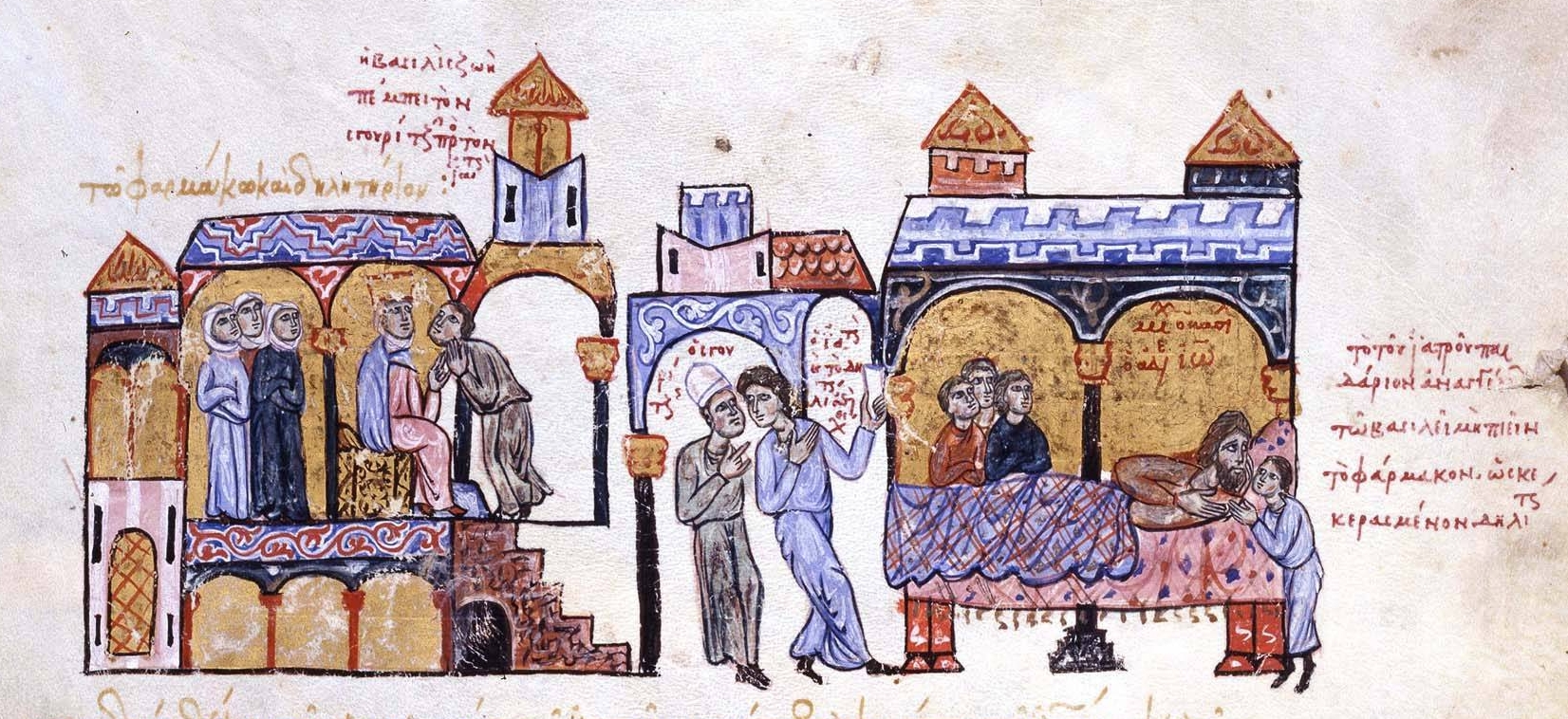
Zoe asks Sgouritzes to poison John the Orphanotrophos

John the Orphanotrophos (Greek: Ἰωάννης ὁ Ὀρφανοτρόφος, romanized: Iōánnēs Orphanotróphos) was a highly influential eunuch advisor to the Byzantine Emperor Romanos III (r. 1028–1034). John was born in the region of Paphlagonia. His family were said to be involved in a disreputable trade, perhaps money changing or, according to George Kedrenos, counterfeiting. John was the eldest of five brothers. Two, Constantine and George, were also eunuchs, while the other two, Niketas and Michael, were 'bearded' men; the latter became Michael IV the Paphlagonian after John introduced him to the reigning Empress Zoë. According to Michael Psellos, the two became lovers and may have plotted to assassinate Zoë's husband. Romanos was probably killed in his bath on 11 April 1034. Some contemporary sources implicate John in the assassination.

== Background ==
John first comes to historical attention as a protonotarios and trusted confidant of Basil II (r. 976–1025). He supported the interests of Romanos before he became emperor. After his accession, Romanos made John praepositus sacri cubiculi (head of the imperial household and the highest eunuch position; this title is probably identical with parakoimomenos) and senator.

With the accession of Michael IV, John was able to vigorously pursue his goal of furthering his family's interests. The chronicler John Skylitzes goes so far as to say that 'with John's help all of his brothers became members of the emperor's household'. John saw to it that his sister Maria's husband Stephen was made admiral, his brother Niketas was made duke of Antioch (succeeded by his brother Constantine), and his brother George was made protovestiarios, succeeding Symeon, who resigned in protest at John's behaviour and retired to Mount Olympus. Anthony the Fat, a member of John's extended family, was appointed Bishop of Nicomedia. Although John himself ultimately remained an orphanotrophos, he effectively ran the state as a sort of prime minister. In 1037 John attempted to make himself Patriarch of Constantinople by unsuccessfully trying to have Alexius Studites dismissed from the Patriarchate.

John put Stephen in charge of the fleet that carried George Maniakes and his army to Sicily in 1038. After the disastrous desertions of the Normans, Salernitans and Varangians from Maniakes' army, John recalled Maniakes and had him imprisoned. John appointed Michael Doukeianos as Catepan of Italy.

== Eyes on power ==
As Michael IV's epilepsy worsened, John's grip on power tightened. John persuaded the Empress to adopt Stephen's son Michael as her own, thus ensuring the continuation of the Paphlagonian line. Michael IV died on 10 December 1041, possibly in suspicious circumstances, and was succeeded by Michael V. Having seen Michael elevated to the imperial throne, John made his nephew Constantine his protégé, with the aim, according to Psellos, of ensuring his succession. Michael V exiled John to the monastery of Monobatae in 1041 and then, again according to Psellos, had all of John's male relatives castrated. John and his brother Constantine were blinded in 1042 by order of the Patriarch of Constantinople, Michael I Cerularius. During the reign of Constantine IX, John was sent to Lesbos, where he died on 13 May 1043.

John's position at the head of the state, his ability to remain in power despite the installation of new emperors, and his shrewd pursuit of his family's interests make him one of the most fascinating eunuchs in Byzantine history. As Psellos' description of him in Book 4 of his Chronographia shows, he was a very complex figure, capable of inspiring both admiration and loathing in the same chronicler.
