= Iberia (theme) =

Province of the Byzantine Empire

Theme of Iberia Ἰβηρίας, θέμα Ἰβηρίας
- Theme of the Byzantine Empire
- 1001–1074
- Capital: Theodosioupolis
- Area
  - Coordinates: 39°54′31″N 41°16′37″E
- Government
- Doux
  - 1025/6: Niketas of Pisidia
  - 1045: Katakalon Kekaumenos
  - 1047: Leo Tornikios
  - 1054–59: Basil Apokapes
  - 1071–74: Gregory Pakourianos
- Historical era: Middle Ages
  - Established: 1001
  - Kingdom of Ani was incorporated into Theme.: 1045
  - Constantine IX disbanded "Iberian Army": 1053
  - Disestablished: ca. 1074
Succeeded by
Kingdom of Georgia; Duchy of Kldekari
- Today part of: Turkey

The theme of Iberia (Greek: θέμα Ἰβηρίας) was an administrative and military unit (theme) within the Byzantine Empire carved by the Byzantine Emperors out of several Georgian lands in the 11th century. It was formed as a result of Emperor Basil II’s annexation of a portion of the Bagrationi dynasty domains (1000–1021) and later aggrandized at the expense of several Armenian kingdoms acquired by the Byzantines in a piecemeal fashion in the course of the 11th century. The population of the theme—at its largest extent—was multiethnic with a possible Georgian majority, including a sizable Armenian community of Chalcedonic rite to which Byzantines sometimes expanded, as a denominational name, the ethnonym "Iberian", a Graeco-Roman designation of Georgians. The theme ceased to exist in 1074 as a result of the Seljuk invasions.

== Foundation and enlargement ==
The theme was created by the emperor Basil II (976–1025) from the lands inherited from the Georgian prince David III of Tao. These areas – parts of the Armeno-Georgian marchlands centered on Thither Tao, including Theodosioupolis (now Erzurum, Turkey), Phasiane, Hark’, Apahunik’, Mardali (Mardaghi), Khaldoyarich, and Ch’ormayari – had been granted to David for his crucial assistance to Basil against the rebel commander Bardas Sclerus in 979. However, David's rebuff of Basil in Bardas Phocas’ revolt of 987 evoked Constantinople’s distrust of the Caucasian rulers. After the failure of the revolt, David was forced to make Basil II the legatee of his extensive possessions.

Basil gathered his inheritance upon David’s death in 1000, forcing the successor Georgian Bagratid ruler Bagrat III to recognize the new rearrangement. Bagrat’s son, George I, however, inherited a longstanding claim to David’s succession. While Basil was preoccupied with his Bulgarian campaigns, George gained momentum to invade Tao and Phasiane in 1014. Defeated in the ensuing Byzantine-Georgian wars, George had to relinquish further lands – Kola, Artaan and Javakheti – to the Byzantine crown in 1022. These provinces were organized by Basil II into the theme of Iberia with the capital at Theodosiopolis. Henceforth, the theme of Iberia was administered jointly with Ducate of Chaldia. As a result, the political center of the Georgian state moved north, as did a significant part of the Georgian nobility, while the empire gained a critical foothold for further expansion into the territories of Armenia and Georgia.

The themata of the Byzantine Empire, at the death of Basil II in 1025.

== Government ==
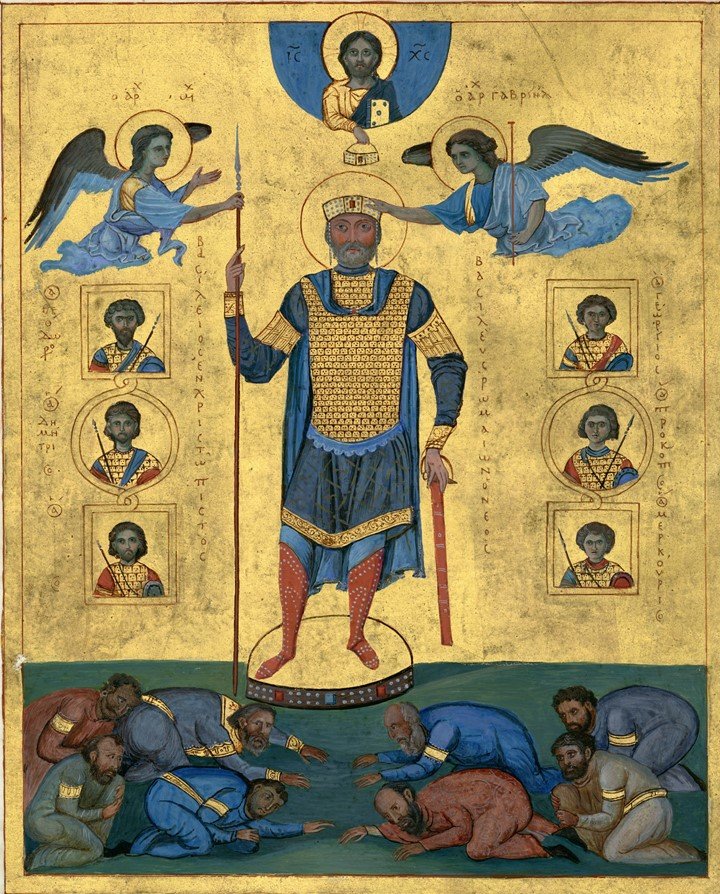
Emperor Basil II, founder of the Theme of Iberia.

The exact chronology of the theme of Iberia and of its governors is not completely clear. Unfortunately, the few Greek seals from the theme or from the ambiguous "Interior Iberia" can seldom be dated precisely. Although many scholars maintain that the theme was probably created immediately after the annexation of David of Tao's princedom, it is difficult to ascertain whether Byzantine rule extended into Tao permanently in 1000 or only after Georgia's defeat in 1022. It is also impossible to identify any commander in Iberia before the appointment, in 1025/6, of the eunuch Niketas of Pisidia as the doux or katepano of Iberia. Some scholars believe, however, that the first doux of Iberia was either Romanos Dalassenos or his brother Theophylactos appointed between 1022 and 1027 in the aftermath of Basil's Georgian campaigns. After 1045 Iberia also included the former Kingdom of Ani. Since 1071 Gregory Pakourianos was a governor of the Theme of Iberia.

The Iberian governor was aided by tax officials, judges, and by co administrators who shared in the exercise of the military and civil duties. Among these officials were the domesticus of the East, the administrators of the districts of which the theme was composed, and the occasional extraordinary legates sent there by the emperor. Apart from the regular Byzantine garrisons, an indigenous army of peasant soldiers guarded the area and received in turn an allotment of tax-free government land. This changed, however, when Constantine IX Monomachos (1042–1055) dismantled the army of the theme of Iberia, perhaps 5,000 men, converting its obligations from military service to the payment of tax. Constantine dispatched Nikolaos Serblias to conduct an inventory and to exact taxes that had never been demanded previously.

== End of the theme ==
Constantine's reforms caused great discontent in the theme and exposed it to hostile attack aided by the removal of regular troops from the region, first to crush the Macedonian revolt of Leo Tornicius, himself the former catapan of Iberia (1047), and later to halt the Pecheneg advance.

In 1048–9, the Seljuk Turks under Ibrahim Yinal made their first incursion in this region and clashed with a combined Byzantine-Armenian and Georgian army of 50,000 at the Battle of Kapetrou on September 10, 1048. During this expedition, tens of thousands of Christians are said to have been massacred and several areas were reduced to piles of ashes. In 1051/52, Eustathius Boilas, a Byzantine magnate who moved from Cappadocia to the theme of Iberia, found the land "foul and unmanageable... inhabited by snakes, scorpions, and wild beasts."

About 1053 Constantine IX disbanded what the historian John Skylitzes calls the "Iberian Army", which consisted of 50,000 men, and was turned into a contemporary Drungary of the Watch. Two other knowledgeable contemporaries, the former officials Michael Attaleiates and Kekaumenos, agree with Skylitzes that by demobilizing these soldiers Constantine did catastrophic harm to the Empire's eastern defenses. Kekaumenos says that Constantine's demobilization covered "Iberia and Mesopotamia", Attaliates refers to the demobilized district as "the Iberian land" which was evidently the same as "the land of the Iberians". the region of the demobilized "Iberian Army" evidently included everything north of the ducates of Antioch and Edessa and east of the old Anatolian themes. The other themes were probably called "Iberian" because after the conquest of Iberia in 1000 the general command over them was transferred from the Duke of Mesopotamia to the Duke of Iberia.

In the aftermath of the Battle of Manzikert in 1071, the south-eastern parts of the theme were annexed by Seljuks. Still, it may have lasted as late as 1074 when Gregory Pakourianos, a Byzantine governor, formally ceded a portion of the theme including Tao and Kars to King George II of Georgia. This did not help, however, to stem the Turkish advance and the area became a battleground of the Georgian-Seljuk wars.

== See also ==
- Byzantine–Georgian wars
- Byzantine–Seljuq Wars
