= Michael V Kalaphates =

Byzantine emperor from 1041 to 1042

- Emperor and Autocrat of the Romans
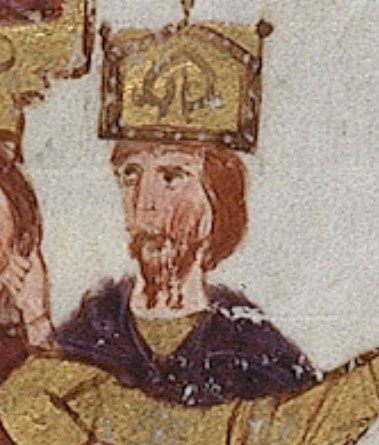
- Michael V, 11th century depiction from the Madrid Skylitzes

Byzantine emperor
- Reign: 13 December 1041 – 21 April 1042
- Predecessor: Michael IV
- Successor: Zoe and Theodora
- Augusta: Zoe
- Born: roughly 1015
- Died: 24 August 1042 (aged 26–27); Monastery of Stoudios, Constantinople (now Istanbul, Turkey)
- Dynasty: Macedonian (by adoption)
- Father: Stephen, a caulker; Michael IV the Paphlagonian (adoptive)
- Mother: Maria, a Paphlagonian; Zoë Porphyrogenita (adoptive)

Michael V Kalaphates (Ancient Greek: Μιχαήλ Καλαφάτης, Michaḗl Kalaphátēs) was Byzantine emperor for four months in 1041–1042. He was the nephew and successor of Michael IV and the adoptive son of Michael IV's wife Empress Zoe. He was popularly called "the Caulker" (Kalaphates) in accordance with his father's original occupation.

== Family ==
Michael V was the son of a couple named Stephen and Maria. His birth date is not known, but is sometimes given as c. 1015, probably because he was considered "young" in 1035. Michael's mother was a sister of the Byzantine emperor Michael IV, and Stephen had been a caulker before becoming an admiral under Michael IV and then botching an expedition to Sicily. Although the emperor preferred another of his nephews, the future Michael V was advanced as heir to the throne by his other uncle John the Orphanotrophos and the Empress Zoe. In 1035, Michael IV granted him the title of kaisar (caesar), and, together with Zoe, adopted his nephew as a son. Michael IV died on 10 December 1041 and Michael V was proclaimed emperor three days later by Zoe.

== Reign ==
Determined to rule on his own, Michael V came into conflict with his uncle John the Orphanotrophos, whom he almost immediately banished to a monastery. Michael now reversed his uncle's decisions, recalling the nobles and courtiers who had been exiled during the previous reign, including the future patriarch Michael Keroularios and the general George Maniakes. Maniakes was promptly sent back to Southern Italy in order to contain the advance of the Normans.

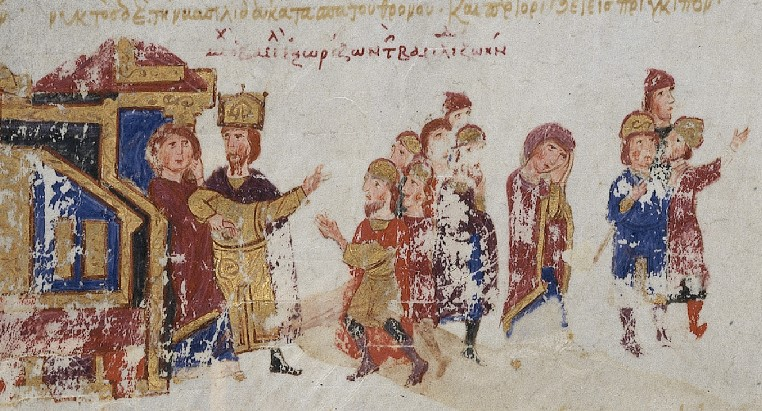
Michael V banishes Zoe to a monastery.

On the night of 18 April to 19 April 1042, Michael V banished his adoptive mother and co-ruler Zoe, for plotting to poison him, to the island of Principo, thus becoming sole emperor. His announcement of the event in the morning led to a popular revolt; the palace was surrounded by a mob demanding Zoe's immediate restoration. The demand was met, and Zoe was brought back, though still in a nun's habit. Presenting Zoe to the crowds in the Hippodrome did not quell the public's outrage over Michael's actions. The masses attacked the palace from multiple directions. The emperor's soldiers attempted to fight them off and by April 21, an estimated three thousand people from both sides had died. Once inside the palace, the mob pillaged valuables and tore up the tax rolls. Also on 21 April 1042 Zoe's sister Theodora, who had been removed from her nunnery against her will earlier in the uprising, was declared Empress. In response, Michael fled to seek safety in the monastery of the Stoudion together with his remaining uncle, Constantine. Although he had taken monastic vows, Michael was arrested, blinded and sent to a monastery. It is sometimes suggested that it was Harald Hardrada, who blinded him, although this has been challenged by Scheel, who believes this to be ahistorical and argues that the contemporary Greek sources, such as the eyewitness Psellos, do not mention that it was a foreigner who carried out this act, but rather a "commoner", while the Norse sagas rather claim that Harald blinded Michael's successor Constantine IX. Though no early textual evidence links Harald with the event, the Sexstefja indicates that a Norwegian oral tradition about him blinding an emperor existed perhaps as early as the eleventh century.

== See also ==
- List of Byzantine emperors

== Sources ==
- Skylitzes, John (2010) [c. 1100]. Synopsis of Histories. Translated by Wortley, John. Cambridge University Press. ISBN 9781139489157.
- Thurn, Hans, ed. (1973). Ioannis Scylitzae Synopsis historiarum. Berlin-New York: De Gruyter. ISBN 9783110022858.
- Gregory, Timothy E. (2010). A History of Byzantium. Wiley-Blackwell.
- Hussey, J.M., ed. (1966). The Cambridge Medieval History:The Byzantine Empire Part 1. Vol. IV. Cambridge University Press.
- Tougher, Shaun (2008). The Eunuch in Byzantine History and Society. Routledge.
- Treadgold, Warren (1997). A History of the Byzantine State and Society. Stanford: Stanford University Press. ISBN 978-0-8047-2630-6.
- Kazhdan, Alexander, ed. (1991). The Oxford Dictionary of Byzantium. Oxford and New York: Oxford University Press. ISBN 0-19-504652-8.
- Krallis, Dimitrios (2006). "Democratic Praxis and Republican Ideology in the Eleventh Century". Byzantine Studies Conference. Dumbarton Oaks.
- Jeffreys, C., ed. (2016). Michael 5. King's College London. ISBN 978-1-908951-20-5.

Michael V Kalaphates Macedonian Dynasty Born: 1015 Died: 24 August 1042[aged 27]
Regnal titles
Preceded by Michael IV	Byzantine emperor 1041–1042	Succeeded by Zoe and Theodora
