= Michael IV the Paphlagonian =

Byzantine emperor from 1034 to 1041

- Emperor and Autocrat of the Romans
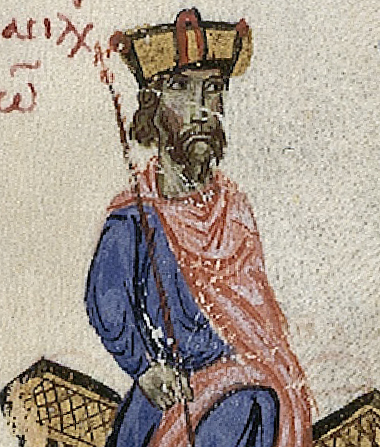
- Michael IV, 11th century depiction from the Madrid Skylitzes

Byzantine emperor
- Reign: 11 April 1034 – 10 December 1041
- Coronation: 12 April 1034
- Predecessor: Romanos III
- Successor: Michael V
- Augusta: Zoe
- Born: c. 1010; Theme of Paphlagonia (now Central Anatolia, Anatolia, Turkey)
- Died: 10 December 1041 (aged 30–31); Monastery of the Holy Anargyroi, Constantinople (now Istanbul, Turkey)
- Burial: Monastery of the Holy Anargyroi, Constantinople
- Spouse: Zoë Porphyrogenita
- Dynasty: Macedonian (by marriage)

Michael IV the Paphlagonian (Greek: Μιχαὴλ ὁ Παφλαγών, romanized: Michaḗl ho Paphlagōn; c. 1010 – 10 December 1041) was Byzantine Emperor from 11 April 1034 to his death on 10 December 1041.

The son of a peasant, Michael worked as a money changer until he was found a job at court by his brother John the Orphanotrophos. He caught the eye of the empress Zoë Porphyrogenita and they began a flagrant affair. It is believed that they conspired to murder her husband, Emperor Romanos III Argyros, who died in 1034. Michael and Zoë were married the same day and Michael was crowned emperor the day after.

Michael, handsome and energetic, had poor health and entrusted most of the business of government to his brother. He distrusted Zoë and went to lengths to ensure that he did not suffer the same fate as his predecessor. The fortunes of the Empire under Michael's reign were mixed. His most triumphant moment came in 1041 when he led the imperial army against Bulgarian rebels. He returned from this victory, but died a few months later.

== Early life and career ==
Michael came from a family of Greek peasants from Paphlagonia. He worked in Constantinople as a money changer, and was rumored to have a secret second occupation as a counterfeiter of coins. One of Michael's brothers, John the Orphanotrophos, also known as John the Eunuch, was the parakoimomenos, a senior courtier who presided over the women's quarters at the imperial palace. John obtained jobs for several of his younger brothers in the court.

Romanos Argyros became emperor of the Byzantine Empire as Romanos III in 1028. "As a ruler he had no ability whatsoever", and his private life was troubled by his failure to conceive a child with his wife Empress Zoë. The couple became alienated, with Romanos taking a mistress and Zoë engaging in a number of affairs. She was enamoured of the handsome young Michael to the extent of flaunting him openly and speaking of making him emperor. Romanos confronted Michael, who denied the accusations, swearing his innocence on holy relics. His suspicions assuaged, Romanos allowed Michael to become his personal servant in 1033.

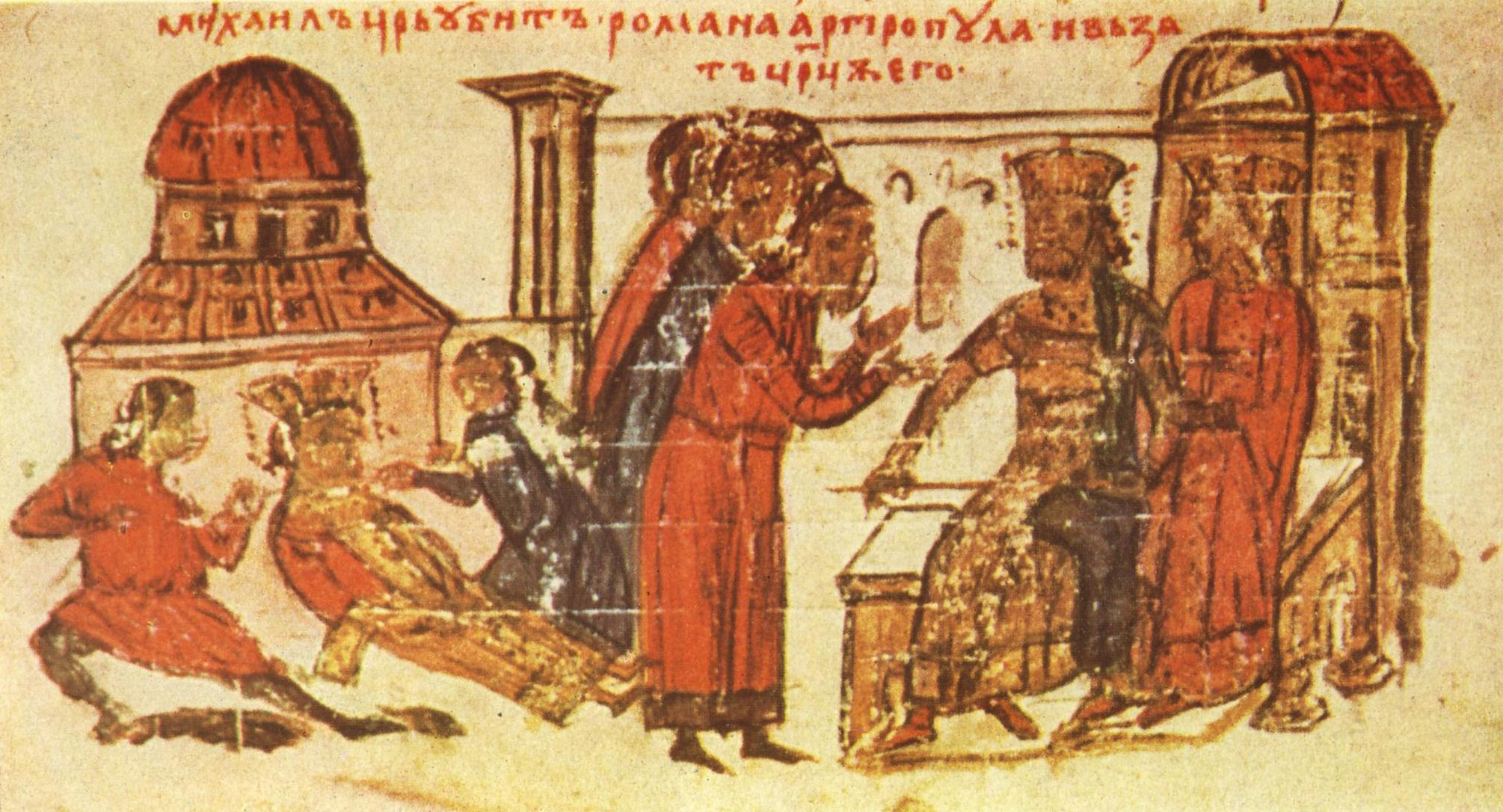
Murder of emperor Romanos III Argyros under the order of Michael IV the Paphlagonian, from the Manasses Chronicle

Romanos became ill in early 1034, and it was widely believed that Zoë and Michael had poisoned him. On 11 April Romanos was found dying in his bath. According to court official and later chronicler Michael Psellus, some of his retinue had "held his head for a long time beneath the water, attempting at the same time to strangle him". John Scylitzes writes as a simple fact that Romanos was drowned on Michael's orders. Matthew of Edessa's account has Zoë poisoning Romanos. Zoë and Michael were married on the day that Romanos III died. The next day the couple summoned the Patriarch Alexios I to officiate at the coronation of the new emperor. Alexios refused to co-operate until the payment of 50 pounds of gold helped change his mind. He crowned Michael as the new Emperor of the Romans as Michael IV.

== Reign ==
=== Domestic policies ===
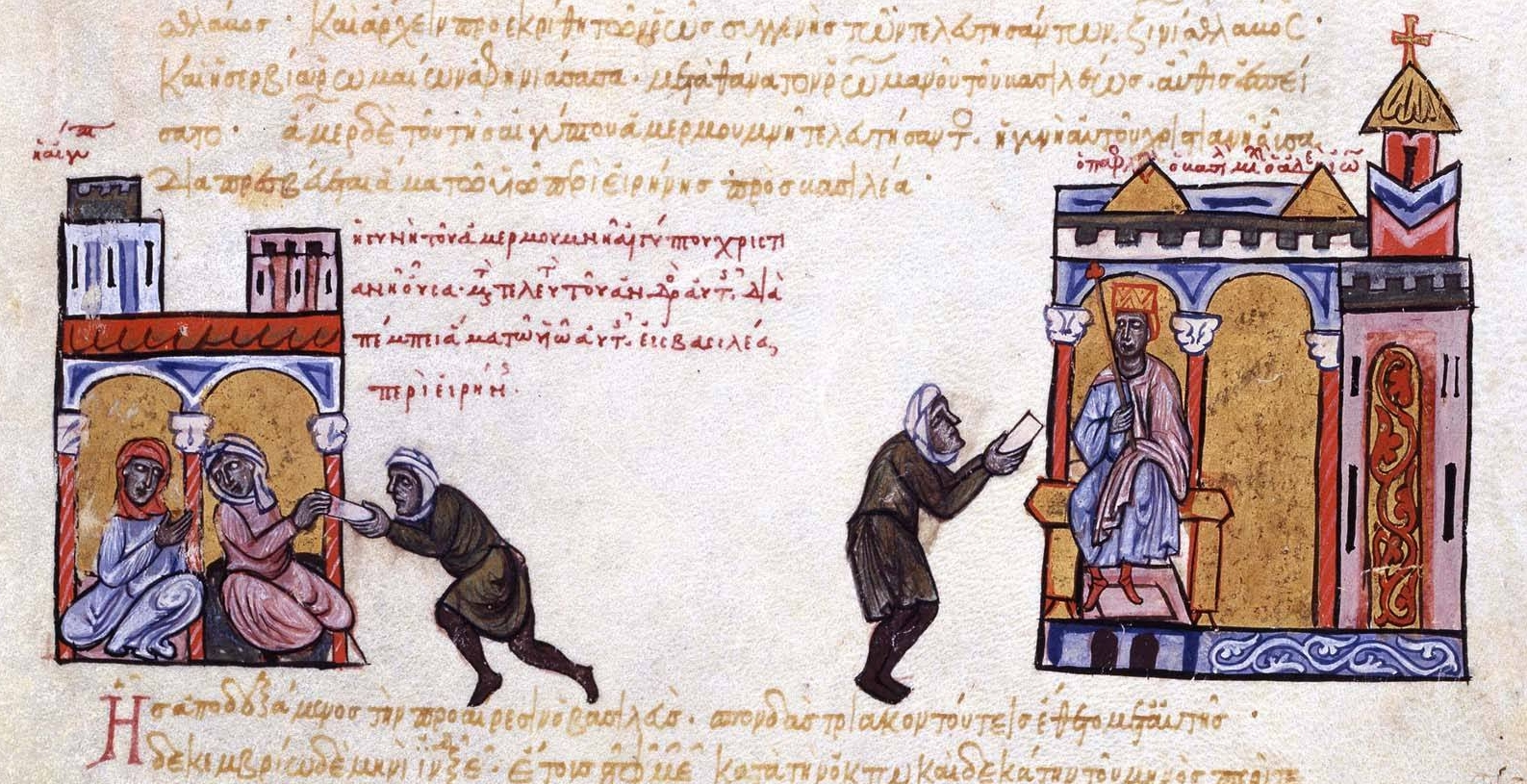
The Christian widow of the caliph of Egypt sends a letter to Michael IV.

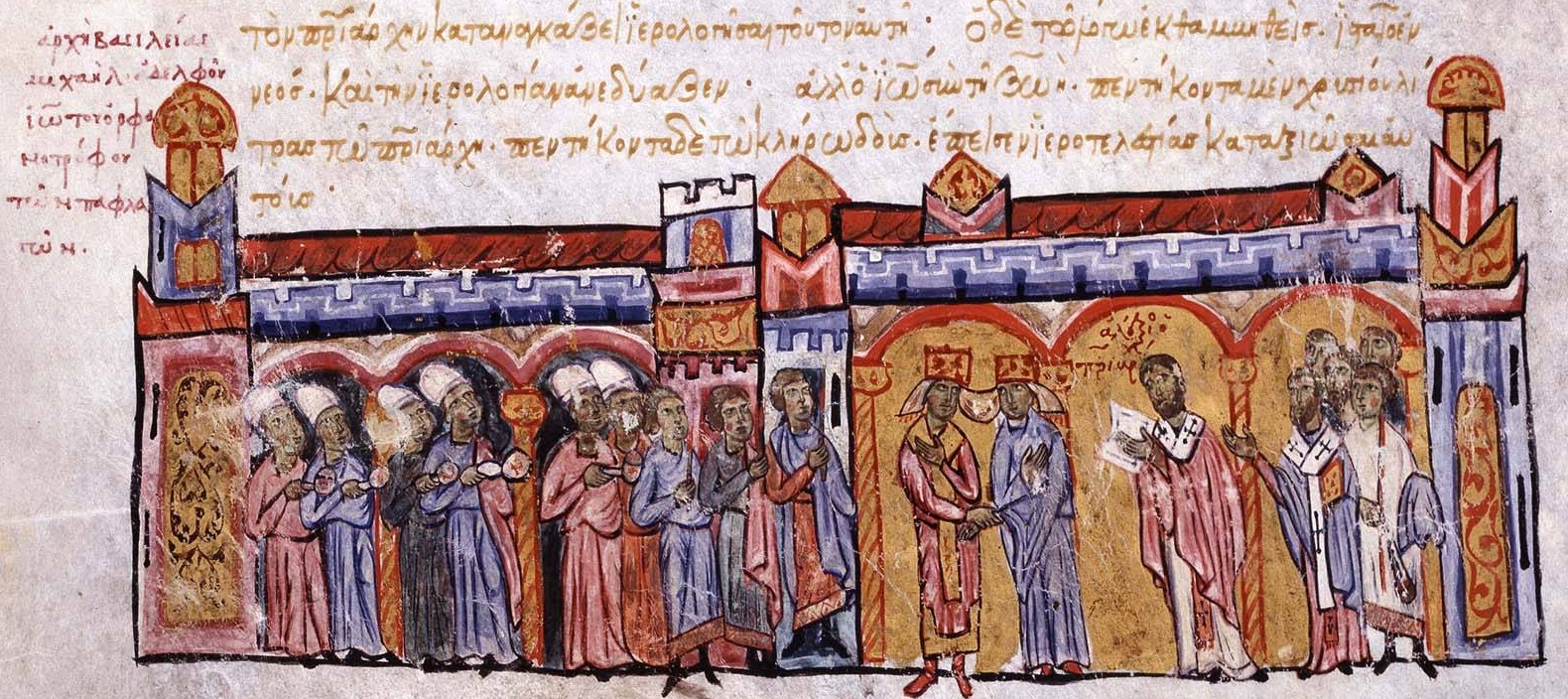
The wedding of Michael and Zoë, as depicted in the Madrid Skylitzes

Michael IV was handsome, clever and generous, but epilepsy and a lack of education prevented him from assuming many of his imperial duties. He was initially reliant on others to direct the government in his name, and afforded significant responsibilities to his brother John, who had already become an influential minister under Constantine VIII and Romanos III. Zoë was disappointed in her hopes that Michael would prove a more devoted husband than Romanos. Fearing that the empress might turn on him as she had turned on his predecessor, Michael excluded her from politics and confined her to the palace gynaeceum (women's quarters). There a watch was kept on Zoë’s activities, and Michael seldom visited her.

John's reforms of the army and financial system revived the strength of the Empire against its foreign enemies but increased taxes, which caused discontent among the nobility and the commons. John's monopoly of the government and the introduction of such taxes as the Aerikon led to several conspiracies against him and Michael. Poor harvests and famine caused by bad weather and by a locust plague in 1035 exacerbated discontent. When Michael tried to exercise a measure of control over Aleppo, the local citizens drove off the imperial governor. There were revolts at Antioch, Nicopolis and in Bulgaria.

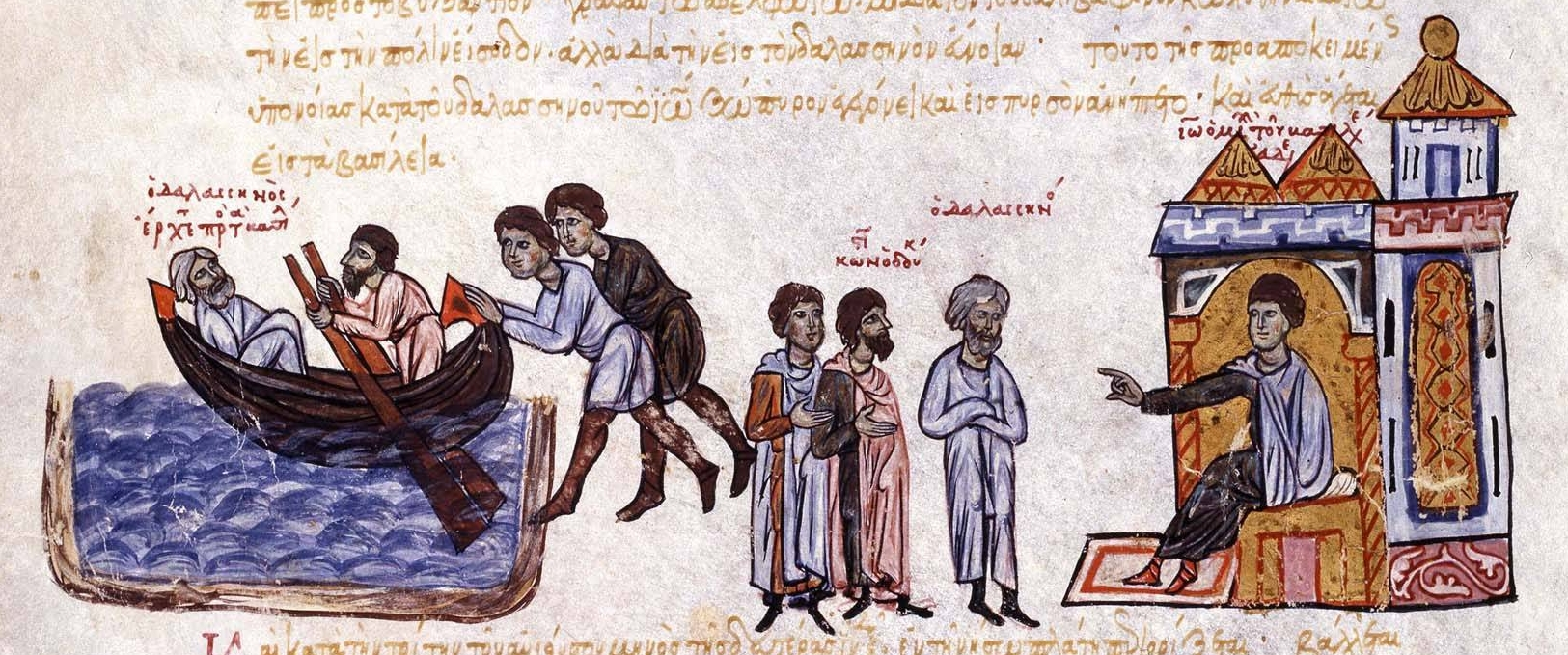
John the Orphanotrophos exiles Constantine Dalassenos.

In 1034 Michael ordered the arrest of Constantine Dalassenos on suspicion of treason, accused of fomenting insurrection at Antioch. In 1037 Zoë conspired to have John the Eunuch poisoned. In 1038 Michael's brother, Constantine, suppressed an uprising of the armies in Anatolia. In 1040 a conspiracy involved the priest Michael Keroularios, who became a monk to save his life and was elected Patriarch of Constantinople under Michael's successor. During the Bulgarian uprising of 1040, John the Eunuch arrested suspected plotters in Anatolia and Constantinople who were hoping to take advantage of the turmoil but was unable to capture the Strategos (military governor) of Theodosiopolis, who joined the rebellion and attempted to capture Thessalonica.

=== Foreign and military affairs ===
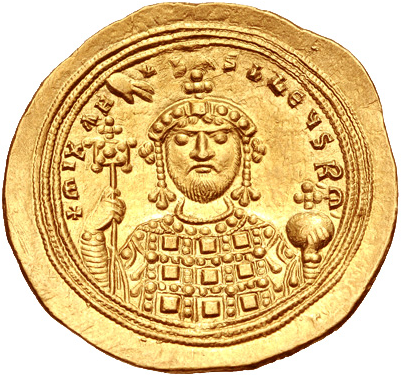
Histamenon of Michael IV.

In terms of military affairs, Michael's reign began poorly. The Arabs sacked Myra, the Serbs threw off Byzantine authority and the Pechenegs raided almost at will up to the gates of Thessalonica. The situation was soon stabilised: on the eastern frontier, Arab pirates were either captured or killed; the Byzantines captured the Muslim fortress of Perkri, on the eastern shore of Lake Van; Edessa was relieved after a long siege and eventually ceded to the empire in 1037.

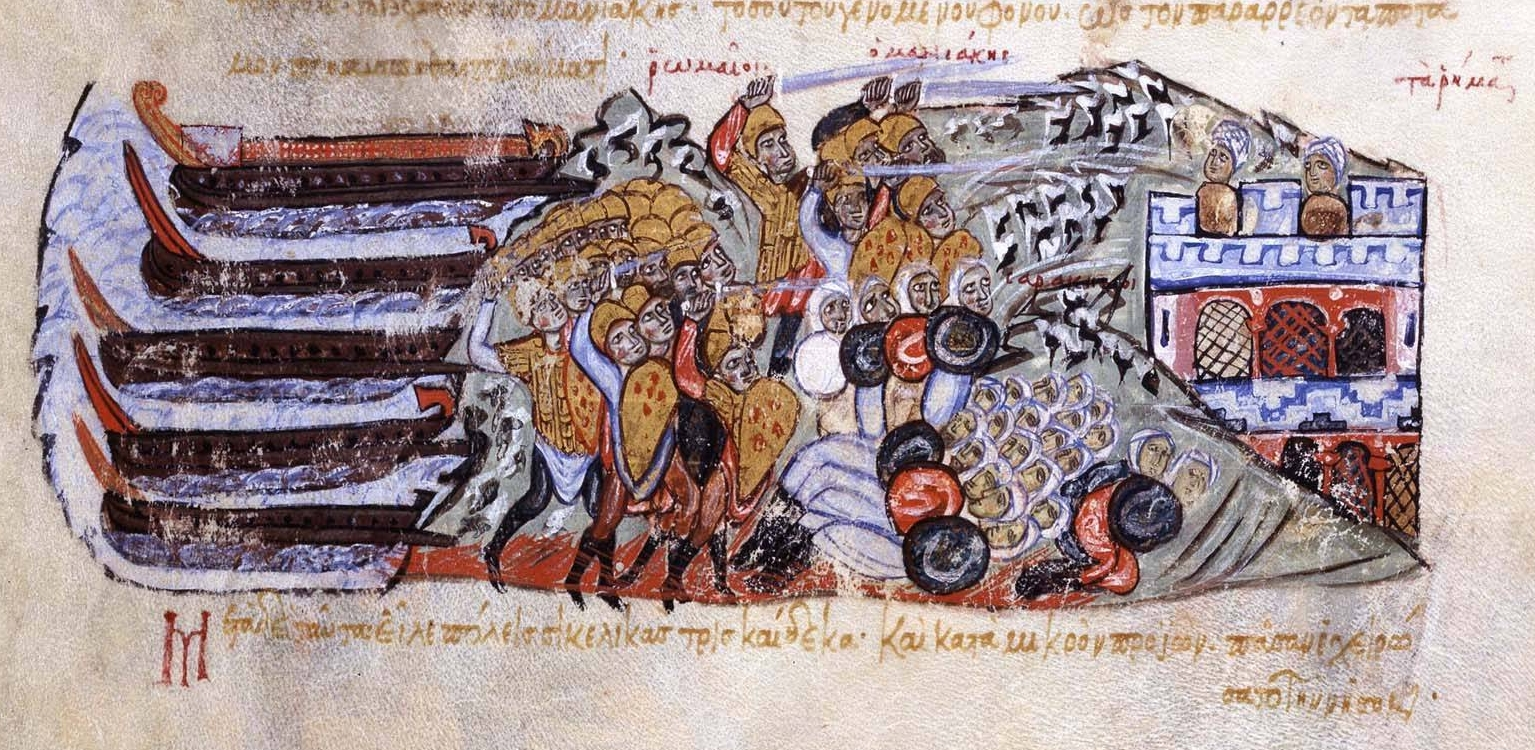
The Byzantine army under George Maniakes lands in Sicily and defeats the Arabs.

On the western front, Michael and John ordered the general George Maniakes to conquer the Emirate of Sicily. In 1038 Maniakes landed in Sicily and soon captured Messina. He then defeated the scattered Arab forces and captured towns in the west and south of the island. By 1040 he had stormed and taken Syracuse. He almost succeeded in driving the Arabs from the island, but Maniakes then fell out with his Lombard allies, while his Norman mercenaries, unhappy with their pay, abandoned the Byzantine general and raised a revolt on the Italian mainland, resulting in the temporary loss of Bari. Maniakes was about to strike against them when he was recalled by John the Eunuch on suspicion of conspiracy. After Maniakes's recall, most of the Sicilian conquests were lost and an expedition against the Normans suffered several defeats, although Bari was eventually recaptured.

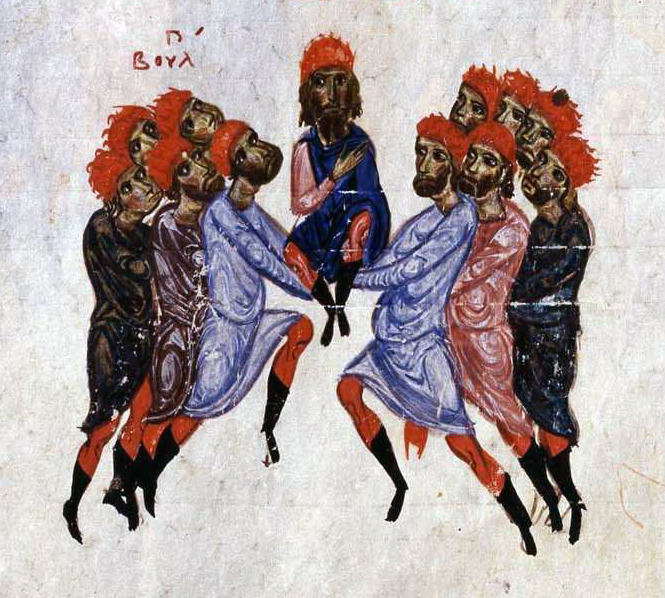
Peter Delyan is proclaimed Emperor of Bulgaria.

In the north, Pecheneg pressure had initially forced the Serbs to seek the protection of the Byzantine Empire and acknowledge Byzantine authority. In 1040 the Serbs again revolted, as did the Bulgarians. This uprising was partly caused by the heavy taxation in coin (and not, as before, in kind) imposed on Bulgaria by John's policies. It also aimed at the restoration of the Bulgarian state under the leadership of Peter Delyan. The rebels seized Belgrade, proclaimed Delyan Emperor of Bulgaria and then quickly took Scupi. Michael IV made things worse by removing from command the doux of Dyrrhachium, who had been marching against Peter Delyan, accusing him of a conspiracy. His troops, largely Bulgarian, joined the revolt and Delyan laid siege to Thessalonica. Dyrrhachium had been lost and Delyan defeated the Strategos of Hellas. Most of the theme of Nicopolis had risen up against Michael, disgusted with the greed of John the Eunuch.

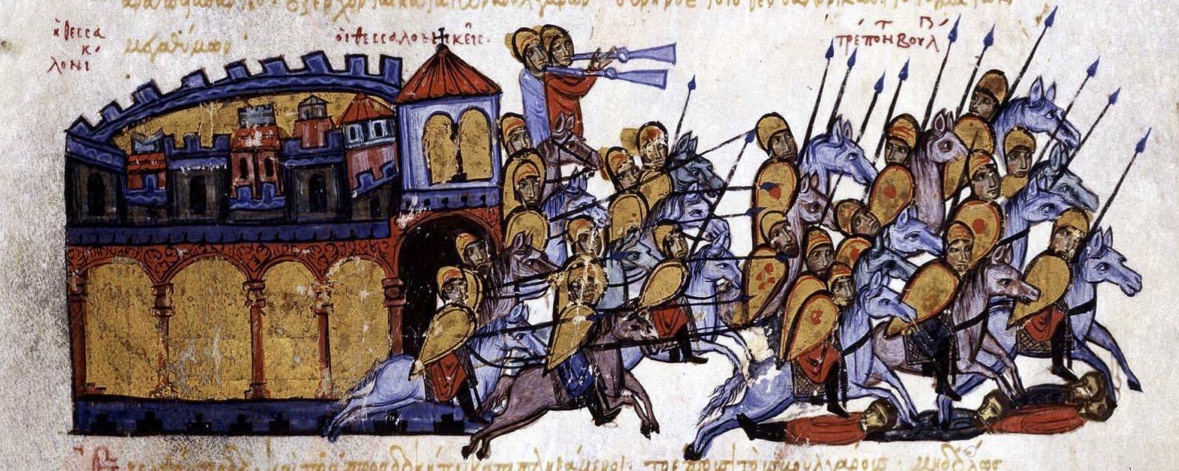
The Bulgarian rebels under Alusian are defeated at the 2nd battle of Thessalonica.

At this point, Michael's epilepsy left him half paralysed and he developed a severe case of dropsy, which caused his legs to become gangrenous. When he announced that he intended to lead the imperial army against the Bulgarians, his advisors were aghast. In 1041 Michael set off towards Macedonia with an army of 40,000 men, assisted by Norse mercenaries, including the future King Harald III of Norway. Gathering his forces at Mosynopolis the Emperor waited for the Bulgarian army. The military position of the Byzantines was aided by internal dissension among the Bulgarians. Michael advanced, relieving Thessalonica then bringing the Bulgarians to battle, defeating them and capturing Delyan. Michael pushed his army aggressively into Bulgaria. The largest remaining Bulgarian contingent was at Prilapon in a fortified camp commanded by Manuel Ivats. The Byzantines stormed the camp, scattered the Bulgarians and captured Ivats. The rigours of the campaign brought Michael close to death, but he was able to return to Constantinople in triumph.

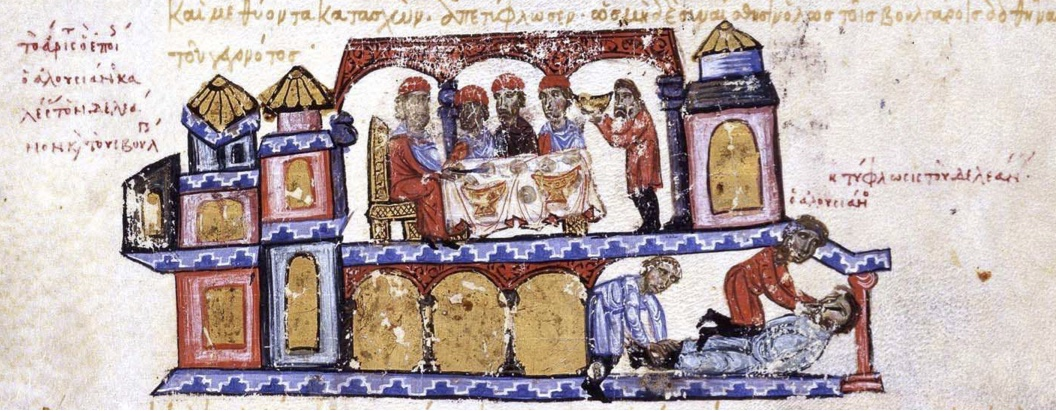
Alusian invites Peter Delyan to a banquet only to betray and blind him.

=== Final illness and death ===
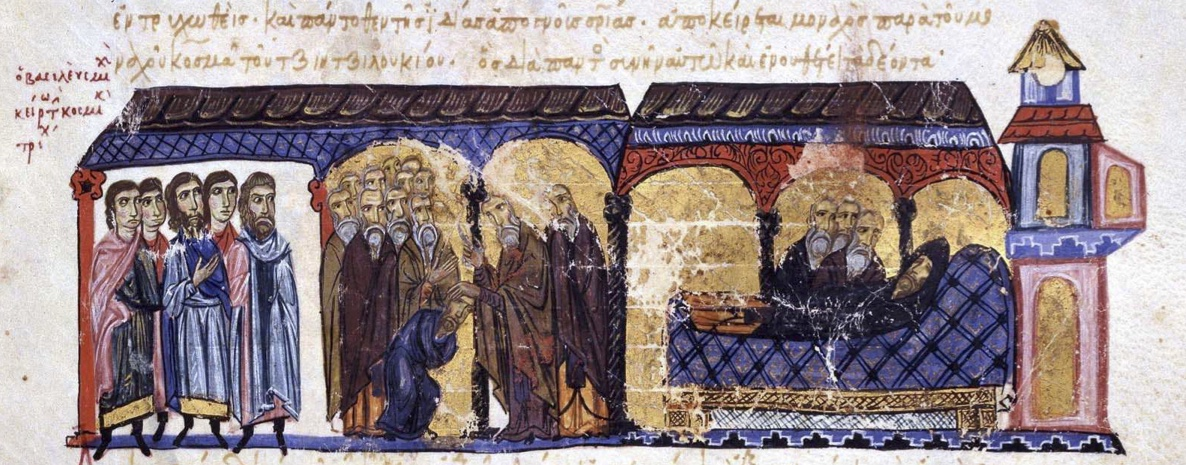
Tonsure and death of Michael IV, as depicted in the Madrid Skylitzes. He is depicted wearing a monastic koukoulion.

Despite his triumphant campaign, it was now clear to all that Michael was dying. He sought heavenly aid by visiting the shrine of Saint Demetrius at Thessalonica and by building or rebuilding churches. In 1041 he gave monetary gifts to every monk and priest in the empire and also to any parents who made him a godfather to their children. John the Eunuch, eager to ensure that power remained in his hands, forced Zoë to adopt Michael's and his nephew, their sister's son, also named Michael. After taking Holy Orders, on 10 December 1041 Michael IV died, refusing to the last to see his wife, who begged that she be allowed to visit him one more time. His nephew was crowned emperor as Michael V.

== See also ==
- List of Byzantine emperors

== Sources ==
=== Primary ===
- Michael Psellus, Chronographia.
- Thurn, Hans, ed. (1973). Ioannis Scylitzae Synopsis historiarum. Berlin-New York: De Gruyter. ISBN 978-3-11-002285-8. OCLC 1030919407.
- Tsamakda, Vasiliki (2002). The illustrated chronicle of Ioannes Skylitzes in Madrid. Leiden: Alexandros. ISBN 90-806476-2-4. OCLC 51900961.

=== Secondary ===
- Finlay, George (1853). History of the Byzantine Empire from 716–1057. Edinburgh: William Blackwood & Sons. OCLC 906577940.
- Garland, Lynda (2006). "Zoë Porphyrogenita". De Imperatoribus Romanis. Archived from the original on 25 March 2022.
- Kazhdan, Alexander, ed. (1991). Oxford Dictionary of Byzantium. Oxford University Press. ISBN 978-0-19-504652-6.
- Norwich, John Julius (1993). Byzantium: The Apogee. Vol. II. London: Penguin. ISBN 978-0-14-011448-5.
- Ostrogorsky, George (1957). History of the Byzantine State. Translated by Hussey, Joan. New Brunswick: Rutgers University Press. OCLC 2221721.
- Treadgold, Warren (1997). A History of the Byzantine State and Society. Stanford, CA: Stanford University Press. ISBN 978-0-8047-2630-6.

Michael IV the Paphlagonian Macedonian dynasty Born: 1010 Died: 10 December 1041
Regnal titles
Preceded by Romanos III	Byzantine emperor 1034–1041	Succeeded by Michael V Kalaphates
