= Yahya of Antioch =

Melkite Christian physician

Yahya of Antioch, full name Yaḥya ibn Saʿīd al-Anṭākī (Arabic: يحيى بن سعيد الأنطاكي), was a Melkite Christian physician and historian of the 11th century.

He was most likely born in Fatimid Egypt. He became a physician, but the anti-Christian policies of Caliph Al-Hakim bi-Amr Allah (r. 996–1021) forced him to flee to Byzantine-held Antioch.

His chief work is a continuation of Eutychius' Annals, stretching from 938 to 1034. Drawing on a variety of sources, his history deals with events in the Byzantine Empire, Egypt, as well as Bulgaria and the Kievan Rus'. Whilst in Antioch, he also wrote theological works in defence of Christianity and refutations of Islam and Judaism. He died c. 1066.

His history was published, edited and translated in 1924 by I. Kratchkovsky and A. Vasiliev into French in Volumes 18, 23, and 47 of the Patrologia Orientalis. In 1997 it was translated into Italian by Bartolomeo Pirone. Polish translation is included in 2015/2016 Ph.D. thesis "Bliski Wschód w kronice Yaḥyi al-Anṭākīego" by Maciej Czyż, and a partial Russian translation by [Viktor von Rosen] also exists. A supposed English translation by J. H. Forsyth in 1977 is in fact only a study.

== Sources ==
- Micheau, Françoise (1998). "Les guerres arabo-byzantines vues par Yaḥyā d'Antioche, chroniqueur arabe melkite du V^{e} /XI^{e} siècle". ΕΥΨΥΧΙΑ. Mélanges offerts à Hélène Ahrweiler. Byzantina Sorbonensia (in French). Paris: Éditions de la Sorbonne. pp. 541–555. ISBN 9782859448301.
