= Syrian Campaigns of Bardas Phokas the Younger =

- Part of the Arab–Byzantine wars
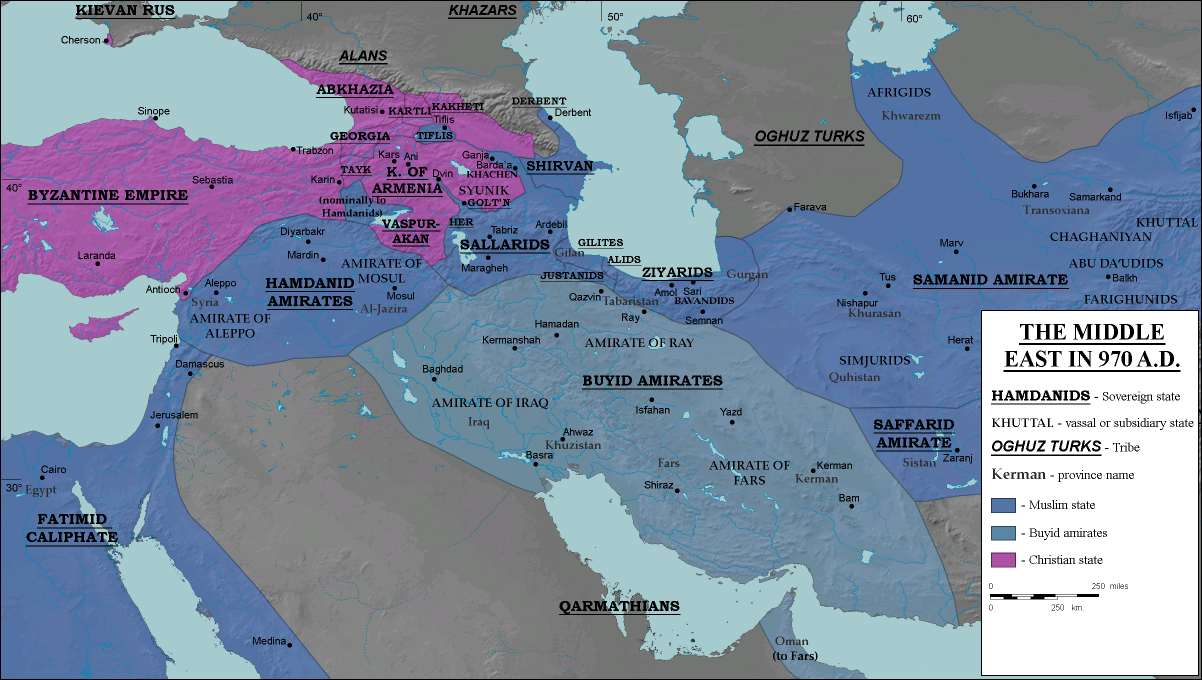
- The domains of the Hamdanid dynasty relative to the neighbouring Fatimid Caliphate, Buyid Emirate and the Byzantine Empire c. 970
Date	981 – Summer 986
Location	Syria
Result	Byzantine victory
Territorial changes	Resumption of tribute from the Hamdanids to Byzantium

Belligerents
Byzantine Empire	Hamdanid dynasty Fatimid Caliphate (985–986)

Commanders and leaders
Bardas Phokas the Younger; Leon Melissenos	Sa'd al-Dawla; Qarghuyah

Strength
Unknown	Unknown

The Syrian Campaigns of Bardas Phokas the Younger were a series of three separate offensives conducted by Byzantine forces under the Domestikos Bardas Phokas during the reign of Emperor Basil II. In 981, 983 and 985–986, Phokas attacked the territory of Aleppo after its Hamdanid Emir Sa'd al-Dawla withheld payment of tribute to Byzantium. Despite a limited intervention by the Fatimid Caliphate in 985, Phokas' campaigns ultimately succeeded in forcing the resumption of the tribute from Aleppo and bolstered the political position of the Byzantine Empire in northern Syria.

== Background ==
In the late 970s, the Byzantine influence in Syria that had emerged following the repeated campaigns of the Emperors Nikephoros II Phokas and John I Tzimiskes, concluding in the Treaty of Safar, was temporarily diminished by the onset of a civil-war between the loyalist forces of Basil II and the rebel forces of Bardas Skleros. The conflict had culminated with the defeat of Skleros in the Battle of Pankaleia by Phokas, and in subsequent flight of the rebel to the Buyid court at Baghdad. For his victory, Phokas was rewarded with a triumph that strengthened his political position within the empire. Following the suppression of Skleros' rebellion, the Byzantines gradually began to reassert their influence in Syria. In 980, Basil II appointed a man named Kurmruk as governor of Latakia, in order to stem the attacks of the Fatimid Caliphate, whose forces began raiding Byzantine territory. Kurmruk soon defeated a Fatimid raiding army in a night attack, but later in the year a second Fatimid raiding force managed to capture Kurmruk and sent him as prisoner to Cairo, where the Fatimids executed him.

== Syrian campaigns of Bardas Phokas ==
=== First Campaign ===
Shortly after the defeat of Kurmruk, Byzantine forces under the leadership of the Domestikos Bardas Phokas began operations in the region. Phokas' first object was the restoration of the tribute, paid previously by the Hamdanid Emirate of Aleppo to the Byzantines, via military force in November 981. Phokas' men engaged the Hamdanid forces in a number of skirmishes and eventually succeeded in forcing their way to the gates of Aleppo. The Hamdanids were forced to resume payment of the tribute, though Phokas permitted a settlement on more lenient terms than before, as the annual tribute was reduced from 700,000 to 400,000 dirhams (or 20,000 gold dinars).

=== Second Campaign ===
Sa'd al-Dawla did not adhere to this agreement however, and payment of the tribute was withheld for the next two years. In 983, a mutual threat to the Byzantines and Hamdanids materialised with the overtures of Bakjur, the Hamdanid wali of Homs, who had previously been exiled by Sa'd al-Dawla to the Fatimids. After being reinforced with Fatimid troops from Damascus, Bakjur advanced against Aleppo and invested the city. However, Bakjur raised the siege when Ibn al-Jarrah, a former refugee Bakjur had sheltered at Homs, arrived to inform him that Bardas Phokas was mounting another campaign towards Aleppo, seeking to extract the tribute Sa'd al-Dawla had withheld in the prior years. After Bakjur's withdrawal, the Hamdanid and Byzantine forces fought one another. After an unsuccessful series of engagements with the Byzantine troops, Sa'd was forced to pay the tribute withheld in both years, 800,000 dirhams in total. After subduing Aleppo, Bardas Phokas advanced to attack Homs, an action which Sa'd al-Dawla allegedly requested from the Byzantines to prevent the settlement from being used by his regional rival, Bakjur. On October 29 983, the Byzantines captured and destroyed Homs after its populace refused to pay the sum Phokas attempted to extort from them. Phokas then advanced along the coastal route from the direction of Tripoli, until he returned to Antioch.

=== Third Campaign ===
According to Yahya of Antioch, tribute payments from Aleppo to the Byzantines were stopped once again in 985. This cessation of tribute payment by Aleppo brought about another Byzantine military response, which was once again led by Bardas Phokas. Phokas advanced into Syria in July 985 and besieged the settlement of Kilis to the north of Aleppo, capturing the fortress and imprisoning its populace. Phokas then advanced against the city of Apameia, which was invested by the Byzantine army. Rather than confront the Byzantines in open battle, Sa'd al-Dawla dispatched his lieutenant Qarghuya on a diversionary raid. Qarghuya plundered the Church of Saint Simeon Stylites near Antioch, where his forces slaughtered the monks and enslaved the refugees that had fled there, sending them to Aleppo as a spectacle.

Around this time, a force dispatched by the Fatimid Caliphate had entered the vicinity and occupied the fortress of Balanias. According to the historian Anthony Kaldellis, it is possible that Sa'd al-Dawla found diplomatic common ground with the Fatimids, as he placed Aleppo under the nominal authority of the Fatimids around this time (having previously been superficially subject to the Buyid Emirate). It is thus likely that the occupation of Balanias was an attempt by the Fatimids to aid the Hamdanids. With Bardas Phokas already engaged in fighting the Hamdanids, Emperor Basil II appointed Leon Melissenos to the position of Doux of Antioch and ordered him to lead a campaign to recapture Balanias. An initial attack on the fortress by Melissenos was repulsed by the Fatimids, prompting the doux to initiate a withdrawal. However, Melissenos then received a letter from Basil threatening him with forced reimbursement of the costs of his campaign if he failed. Melissenos consequently renewed his attack, and this time he defeated the Fatimids and successfully captured Balanias.

=== Treaty of 986 ===
In the meantime, Bardas Phokas had dispatched forces which achieved a number of successes in engagements with the Hamdanids, including the sack of a nearby fortress at Kafartab, while he maintained the siege of Apameia. The Syrian Arabs began to fear that Phokas planned to discard the treaty of Safar and permanently annex the Hamdanid Emirate. However, before he could take the city, Phokas received a letter from the emperor ordering him to lift the siege. Although Apameia had held out, the other Byzantine military successes brought mounting strategic pressure against the Hamdanids that diminished Sa'd al-Dawla's will to continue resistance. Ultimately, around Summer 986, Sa'd al-Dawla was forced to conclude a new treaty. Under the terms of this agreement, the Hamdanids recognised the authority of the Fatimid Caliph but simultaneously renewed their tribute of 200,000 dirhams to the Byzantine Empire. (Note: The defeat at Balanias had made the Fatimids weary of continuing their military support for the Hamdanids, as Caliph al-Aziz Billah sought to avoid a prolonged conflict with the Byzantines at this time. Consequently, as nominal overlord of Aleppo, al-Aziz may have applied additional diplomatic pressure upon Sa'd al-Dawla to renew the previous tributary agreement with Constantinople in exchange for peace.)

== Aftermath ==
While Bardas had engaged in his third campaign against the Hamdanids, political developments in Constantinople, where Basil II had imprisoned Parakoimomenos Basil Lekapenos, resulted in the centralisation of imperial power around the emperor. Soon after the governmental rebalance, Basil II demoted Phokas from the position of Domestikos as he was a relative of the earlier Emperor Nikephoros II, and thus represented a potential threat to Basil's newly consolidated position. However, Basil's position deteriorated following the catastrophic defeat against Samuel of Bulgaria at the Battle of the Gates of Trajan in August 986. When the Buyids allowed Bardas Skleros to return to Byzantium and renew his rebellion, collecting numerous followers once he had reached Anatolia, Bardas Phokas defected to Skleros after being sent by Basil II to crush the usurper. This resulted in a civil war, which culminated with the death of Bardas Phokas and the victory of Basil II in 989. The enemies of the Byzantines did not exploit the civil war to undermine their position in Syria, as Basil managed to conclude a truce with the Fatimids in 987, which lasted until 989, under the terms of which the Fatimid Caliph al-Aziz replaced the Buyid ruler in the prayers held in Constantinople's mosques.

== Bibliography ==
- Forsyth, John Harper (1977). The Byzantine-Arab Chronicle (938-1034) of Yahya b. Sa'id al-Antaki. University of Michigan.
- Kaldellis, Anthony (2017). Streams of Gold, Rivers of Blood: The Rise and Fall of Byzantium, 955 A.D. to the First Crusade. Oxford University Press. ISBN 978-0190253226.
- Treadgold, Warren (1997). A History of the Byzantine State and Society. Stanford, California: Stanford University Press. ISBN 978-0804779371.
- Stevenson, William B. (1926). "Chapter VI. Islam in Syria and Egypt (750–1100)". In Bury, John Bagnell (ed.). The Cambridge Medieval History: Contest of Empire and Papacy. Vol. V. New York: The Macmillan Company. pp. 242–264.
- Whittow, Mark (1996). The Making of Byzantium, 600–1025. Berkeley and Los Angeles, California: University of California Press. ISBN 978-0-520-20496-6.
