= Basilica Therma =

Roman spa in Yozgat

- Kral Kızı Hamamı (Turkish)
- Sarıkaya Roma Hamamı
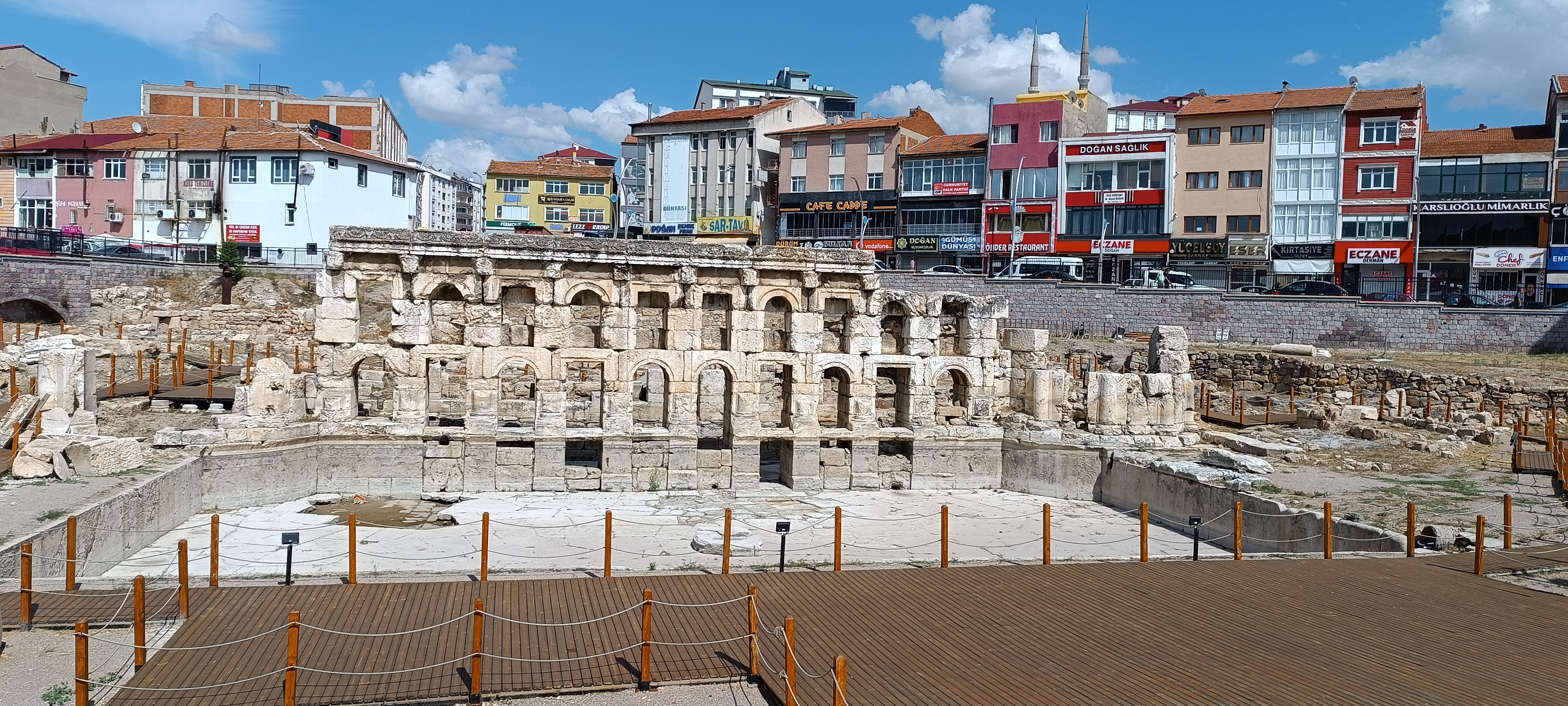

- Location within Turkey
- 39°29′41.7″N 35°22′34.7″E
- Type: Public Bath
- Location: Terzili Hamam, Yozgat Province, Turkey

History
- Built: 2nd century

Site notes
- Public access: Yes

Basilica Therma (Turkish: Kral Kızı Hamamı or Sarıkaya Roma Hamamı) is an ancient Roman spa town located in the Yozgat province of Turkey. It is thought to be the ancient Aquae Saravenae (Akova - Saravena), though this is disputed with nearby Kırşehir.

The bath was built in the 2nd century and used in Byzantine, Seljuk, and Ottoman periods and still open to the public in modern Turkey.

The large thermal pool measures 23,30x12,80 meters and has a depth of 1.34 meters. Pool water is about 45 °C. There is an inner pool measuring 16.00x4.00 meters with symmetrical ladders on its both sides. The third pool with thermal water boiling from the floor is positioned perpendicular to the inner pool. The pool is 15.00x5.20 meters with a semi-circular shape on its short sides.

The bath is added to the UNESCO List of World Heritage Sites Tentative List in 2018.

== Etymology ==
The bath was mentioned for the first time in the 2nd century AD in the Ptolemaic Atlas, with the Ancient Greek script as “Σαρούηνα” (Sarouena).

It is written as “Aquae Saravenae” in Latin sources. The 13th century copy of the Peutinger Map, whose original is thought to have been drawn in the 4th or 5th century, reads “Aquas Aravenas” in corrupted Latin.
