= Basil II =

Byzantine emperor from 976 to 1025

- Emperor and Autocrat of the Romans
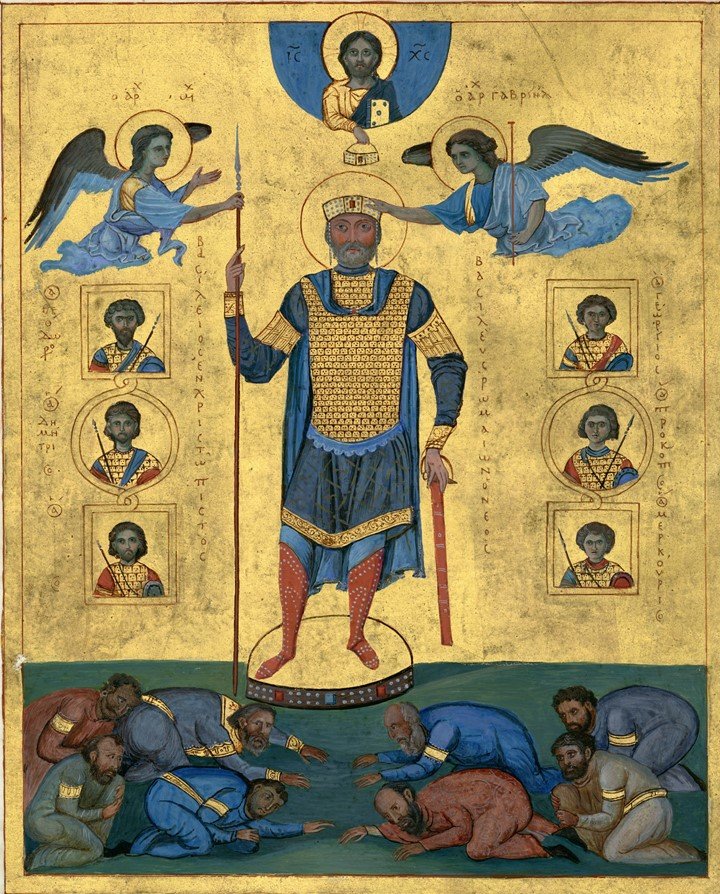
- Restored depiction of Basil II from his Menologion, National Historical Museum, Athens

Byzantine emperor
- Reign: 15 March 963 – 15 December 1025 (alone from 10 January 976)
- Coronation: 22 April 960
- Predecessor: Romanos II
- Successor: Constantine VIII
- Co-Emperors: See list: Constantine VIII (962–1025); Nikephoros II Phokas (963–969); John I Tzimiskes (969–976)
- Born: 958; Constantinople, Byzantine Empire
- Died: 15 December 1025 (aged 66/67); Constantinople, Byzantine Empire
- Burial: Church of St. John the Theologian, Constantinople
- Greek: Βασίλειος
- Dynasty: Macedonian
- Father: Romanos II
- Mother: Theophano
- Religion: Chalcedonian Christianity (Note: The Eastern Orthodox Church and the Roman Catholic Church were under communion as the Chalcedonian Church until the East-West Schism of 16 July 1054.)
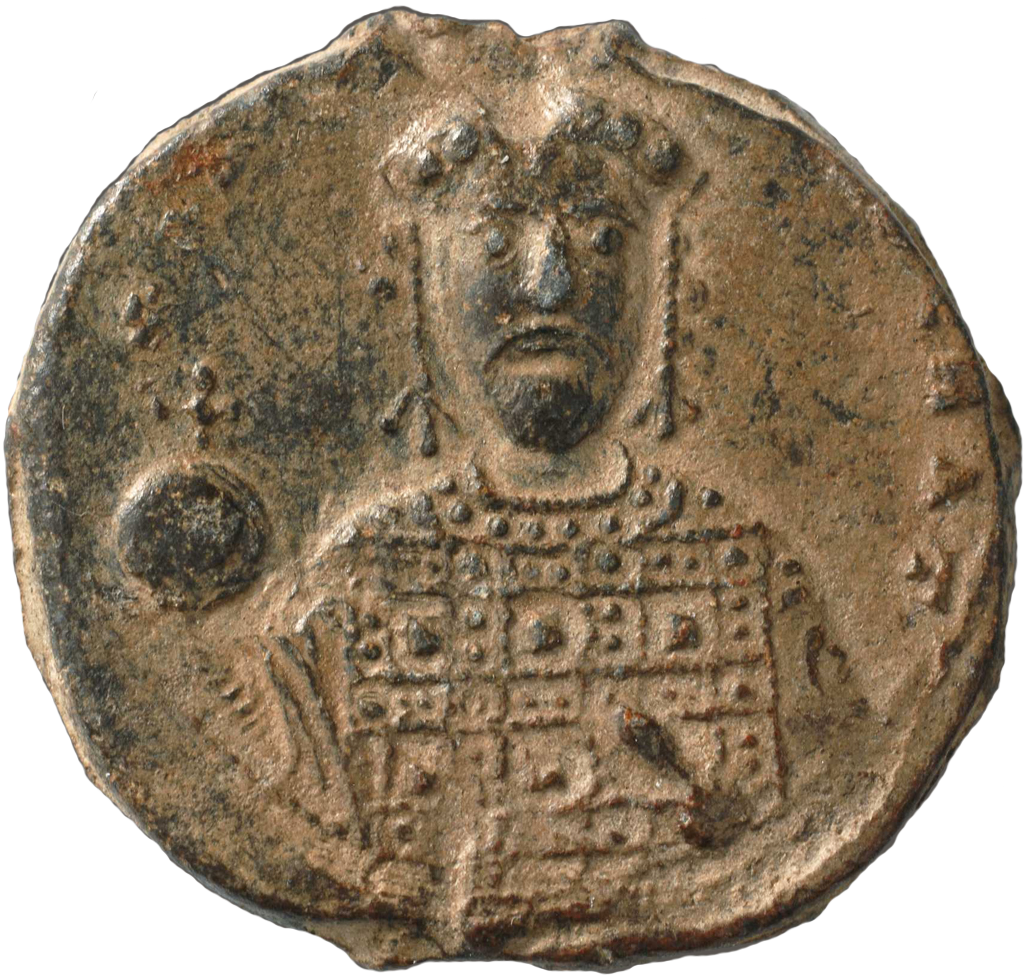
- Seal

Basil II Porphyrogenitus (Greek: Βασίλειος Πορφυρογέννητος, romanized: Basíleios Porphyrogénnētos; (Note: Regnal numbers were never used in the Byzantine Empire. Instead, the Byzantines used nicknames and patronymics to distinguish rulers of the same name. The numbering of Byzantine emperors is a purely historiographical invention, beginning with Edward Gibbon in his History of the Decline and Fall of the Roman Empire. In his lifetime and later, Basil was distinguished from his namesake predecessor by the surnames "the Younger" (Greek: ὁ νέος, romanized: ho neos) and most often "the Purple-born" (Greek: ὁ πορφυρογέννητος, romanized: ho porphyrogénnetos).) 958 – 15 December 1025), given the epithet The Bulgar-Slayer, (Note: (Greek: ὁ Βουλγαροκτόνος, ho Boulgaroktónos, Bulgarian: Българоубиец); Basil's blinding of Bulgarian prisoners after the Battle of Kleidion, although it may have been exaggerated, helped give rise to his epithet "the Bulgar Slayer" (Greek: ὁ Βουλγαροκτόνος, romanized: ho Boulgaroktonos). Stephenson (2000, p. 62) and Magdalino (2003, p. 10) believe the epithet to have entered common usage among the Byzantines at the end of the 12th century, when the Second Bulgarian Empire broke away from Byzantine rule and Basil's martial exploits became a theme of Imperial propaganda. It was used by the historian Niketas Choniates and the writer Nicholas Mesarites, and consciously inverted by the Bulgarian ruler Kaloyan, who called himself "Roman-slayer" (Greek: Ρωμαιοκτόνος, romanized: Rhomaioktonos).) was the senior Byzantine emperor from 976 to 1025. He and his brother Constantine VIII (Note: The Roman and Byzantine Empires had a number of rulers named Constantine, many of whom are usually not counted using regnal numbers because they were never senior or sole emperor. Five emperors named Constantine ruled during the Macedonian era: Constantine, the eldest son and co-ruler of Basil I; Constantine VII the Porphyrogenitus; Constantine Lekapenos, a son and co-ruler of Romanos I; Constantine VIII; and Constantine IX Monomachos.) were crowned before their father Romanos II died in 963, but they were too young to rule. The throne thus went to two generals, Nikephoros Phokas (r. 963–969) and John Tzimiskes (r. 969–976) before Basil became senior emperor, though his influential great-uncle Basil Lekapenos remained as the de facto ruler until 985. (Note: Basil Lekapenos' control of power until 985 has caused some historians, such as Antonopoulou, Kotzabassi & Loukaki (2015, p. 274) and Schulman (2002, p. 51) to date Basil II's reign from 985 to 1025, although these are only exceptions.) His reign of 49 years and 11 months was the longest of any Roman emperor. (Note: Basil II technically "ruled" as senior emperor for 5 months in 963, between the death of Romanos II (15 March) and the coronation of Nikephoros II (16 August). This would give him a total reign of 50 years and 4 months, although these months in 963 are usually not counted as part of his actual reign.)

The early years of Basil's reign were dominated by civil wars against two powerful generals from the Byzantine Anatolian aristocracy: first Bardas Skleros and later Bardas Phokas, which ended shortly after Phokas' death and Skleros' submission in 989. Basil then oversaw the stabilization and expansion of the eastern frontier of the Byzantine Empire and the complete subjugation of the First Bulgarian Empire, its foremost European foe, after a long struggle. Although the Byzantines had made a truce with the Fatimid Caliphate in 987–988, Basil led a campaign against the Caliphate that ended with another truce in 1000. He also conducted a campaign against the Khazar Khaganate that gained the Byzantine Empire part of Crimea and led a series of successful campaigns against the Kingdom of Georgia.

Despite near-constant warfare, Basil distinguished himself as a capable ruler, reducing the power of the great land-owning families who dominated the administration and military, filling its treasury, and leaving the Empire at its greatest territorial extent in four centuries. Although his successors were largely incompetent, the Empire flourished for decades after Basil's death. One of the most important decisions taken during his reign was to offer the hand of his sister Anna Porphyrogenita to Vladimir I of Kiev in exchange for military support, thus forming the Byzantine military unit known as the Varangian Guard. The marriage of Anna and Vladimir led to the Christianization of the Kievan Rus' and the incorporation of later successor states of Kievan Rus' within the Byzantine cultural and religious tradition. Basil is seen as a Greek national hero but is a despised figure among Bulgarians.

== Physical appearance and personality ==
The courtier and historian Michael Psellos, who was born towards the end of Basil's reign, gives a description of Basil in his Chronographia. Psellos describes him as a stocky man of shorter-than-average stature who nevertheless was an impressive figure on horseback. He had light-blue eyes, strongly arched eyebrows, luxuriant side whiskers—which he had a habit of rolling between his fingers when deep in thought or angry—and in later life a scant beard. Psellos also states that Basil was not an articulate speaker and had a loud laugh that convulsed his whole frame. Basil is described as having ascetic tastes and caring little for the pomp and ceremony of the Imperial court, typically wearing a sombre, dark-purple robe furnished with few of the gems that usually decorated imperial costumes. He is also described as a capable administrator who left a well-stocked treasury upon his death. Basil supposedly despised literary culture and affected scorn for the learned classes of Byzantium.

== Early life and rule (960–976) ==
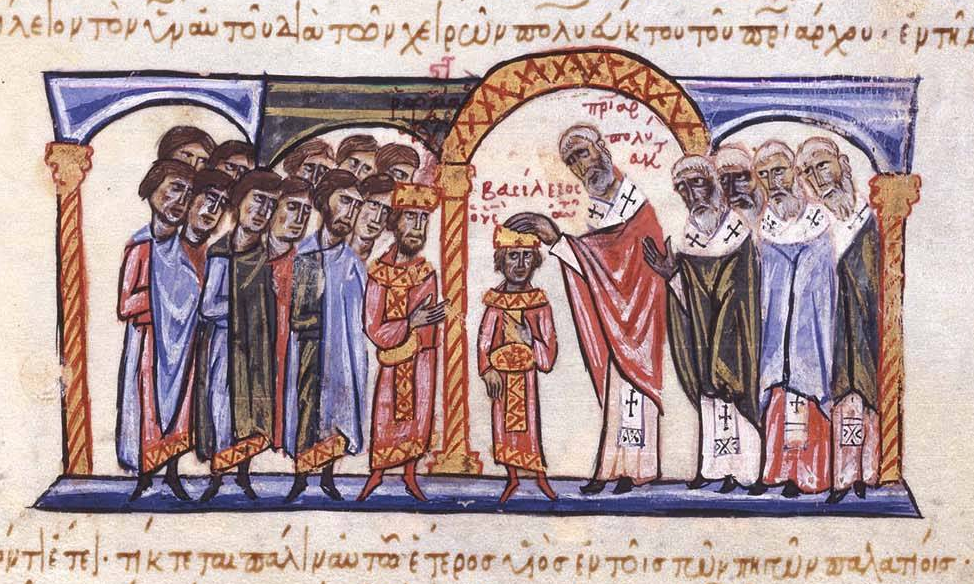
Coronation of Basil as co-emperor, from the Madrid Skylitzes

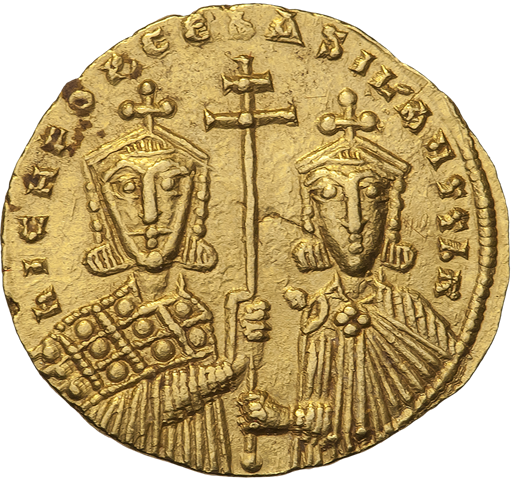
Coin of Nikephoros II (left) and Basil II (right)

Basil II was born in 958. He was a porphyrogennetos ("born into the purple"), as were his father Romanos II and his grandfather Constantine VII; this was the appellation used for children who were born to a reigning emperor. Basil was the eldest son of Romanos and his Laconian Greek second wife Theophano, who was the daughter of a poor tavern-keeper named Krateros and may have originated from the city of Sparta. He may have had an elder sister named Helena (born c. 955). Romanos succeeded Constantine VII as sole emperor upon the latter's death in 959. Basil's father crowned him as co-emperor on 22 April 960, and his brother Constantine (born 960 or 961, eventually to rule as sole emperor Constantine VIII in 1025–1028) in 962 or 963. Only two days after the birth of his youngest child Anna, Romanos II died on 15 March 963 at 24 years of age. His unexpected death was commonly thought at the time to be the result of poisoning with hemlock; the chroniclers Leo the Deacon and John Skylitzes imply that Theophano was responsible, and according to Skylitzes, she had been complicit in an earlier attempt by Romanos II to poison Constantine VII.

Basil and Constantine were too young to rule in their own right when Romanos died in 963. Therefore, although the Byzantine Senate confirmed them as emperors with their mother as the nominal regent, de facto power passed for the time into the hands of the parakoimomenos Joseph Bringas. Theophano did not trust Bringas, however, and another enemy of the powerful parakoimomenos was Basil Lekapenos, an illegitimate, eunuch son of Emperor Romanos I – Basil's great-grandfather. Lekapenos himself had been parakoimomenos to Constantine VII and megas baioulos to Romanos II. Yet another enemy of Bringas was the successful and widely popular general Nikephoros Phokas, who had just returned from his conquest of the Emirate of Crete and a highly successful raid into Cilicia and Syria, which culminated in the sack of Aleppo. Phokas was proclaimed emperor by his men in July and marched on Constantinople. Bringas tried to bring in troops to stop his rival's advance, but the capital's populace supported Nikephoros. Bringas fled, leaving his post to Lekapenos, and on 16 August 963 Nikephoros Phokas was crowned emperor.

On 20 September, Phokas married Theophano, but problems resulted; it was a second marriage for each spouse and Nikephoros was thought to be the godfather of one or both of Theophano's sons. Although Polyeuctus, the patriarch of Constantinople, disapproved of the marriage, the Church declared it to be valid. With it, Nikephoros secured his legitimacy and became the guardian of Basil and Constantine. He was murdered in December 969 by Theophano and his nephew John Tzimiskes, who then became emperor John I and exiled Theophano. John married Theodora, a sister of Romanos II. Basil II acceded to the throne as effective ruler and senior emperor when John died on 10 January 976. He immediately had his mother brought back from her convent.

== Sole emperor (976–1025) ==
=== Rebellions in Anatolia and alliance with Rus' ===
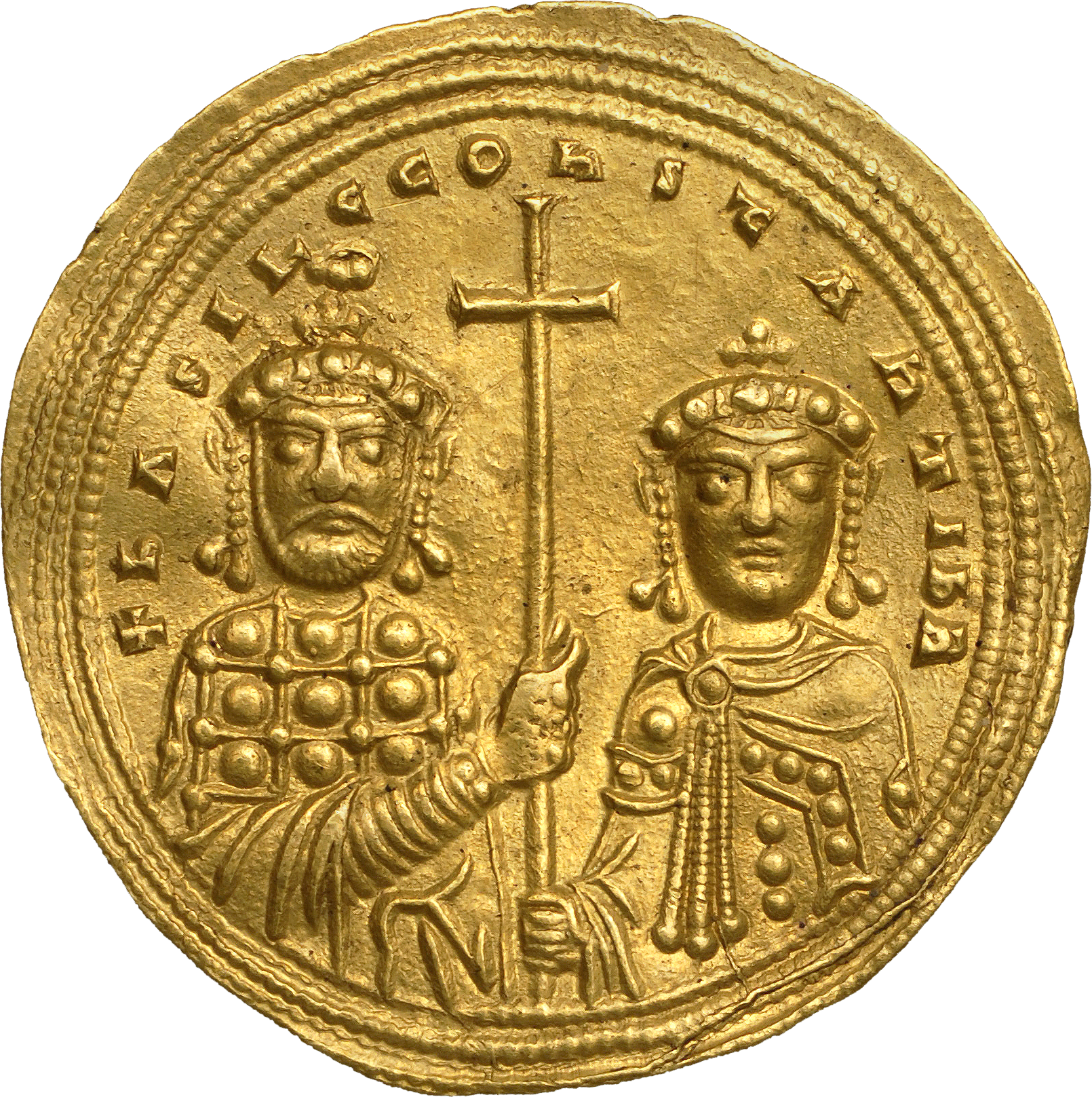
Histamenon of Basil II (left) and Constantine VIII (right)

Basil was a very successful soldier on horseback and through his achievement he proved himself to be an able general and a strong ruler. In the early years of his reign, administration remained in the hands of Basil Lekapenos. As president of the Byzantine Senate, Lekapenos was a wily, gifted politician who hoped the young emperors would be his puppets. The younger Basil waited and watched without interfering, devoting himself to learning the details of administrative business and military science. Nikephoros II and John I were brilliant military commanders but proved to be poor administrators. Towards the end of his reign, John had belatedly planned to curb the power of the great landowners; his death, which occurred soon after he spoke out against them, led to rumors that he had been poisoned by Lekapenos, who had illegally acquired vast estates and feared an investigation and punishment. At the start of his reign, the failures of his immediate predecessors left Basil II with a serious problem: Bardas Skleros and Bardas Phokas, members of the wealthy military elite of Anatolia, had sufficient means to undertake open rebellion against his authority.

Skleros and Phokas, both of whom were experienced generals, wanted to assume the Imperial position that Nikephoros II and John I had held, and thus return Basil to the role of impotent cypher. Basil, showing a penchant for ruthlessness, took to the field himself and suppressed the rebellions of both Skleros (979) and Phokas (989) with the help of 12,000 Georgians of Tornikios and David III Kuropalates of Tao. The fall of Lekapenos occurred between the rebellions in 985; he was accused of plotting with the rebels and was punished with exile and the confiscation of his property.

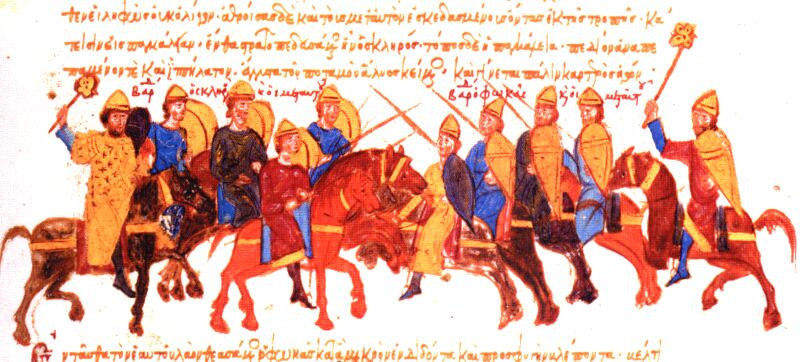
Clash between the armies of Bardas Skleros and Bardas Phokas at Pankaleia, miniature from the Madrid Skylitzes.

The relationship between the two generals was complicated; Phokas was instrumental in defeating the rebellion of Skleros but when Phokas later rebelled, Skleros returned from exile to support him. When Phokas died in battle, Skleros, whom Phokas had imprisoned, assumed the leadership of the rebellion. Basil's brother Constantine—who had no interest in politics, statecraft, or the military–led troops alongside Basil; this was the only military command Constantine would hold. The campaign ended without combat when Skleros was forced to surrender to Basil in 989. Skleros was allowed to live but he died blind, either through disease or from being blinded as punishment for his insurrection.

These rebellions had a profound effect on Basil's outlook and methods of governance. Psellos describes the defeated Skleros giving Basil the following advice, which he took to heart: "Cut down the governors who become over-proud. Let no generals on campaign have too many resources. Exhaust them with unjust exactions, to keep them busied with their own affairs. Admit no woman to the imperial councils. Be accessible to no-one. Share with few your most intimate plans."

To defeat these dangerous revolts, Basil formed an alliance with Prince Vladimir I of Kiev, who in 988 had captured Chersonesos, the Empire's main base in the Crimean Peninsula. Vladimir offered to evacuate Chersonesos and to supply 6,000 of his soldiers as reinforcements to Basil. In exchange, he demanded to be married to Basil's younger sister Anna. At first, Basil hesitated. The Byzantines viewed all of the peoples of Northern Europe—namely Franks and Slavs—as barbarians. Anna objected to marrying a barbarian ruler because such a marriage would have no precedent in Imperial annals.

Vladimir had researched various religions, having sent delegates to various countries. Marriage was not his main reason for choosing Christianity. When Vladimir promised to baptize himself and to convert his people to Christianity, Basil finally agreed. Vladimir and Anna were married in Crimea in 989. The Rus' warriors taken into Basil's army were instrumental in ending the rebellion; they were later organized into the Varangian Guard. This marriage had important long-term implications, marking the beginning of the process by which the Grand Duchy of Moscow many centuries later would proclaim itself "The Third Rome", and claim the political and cultural heritage of the Byzantine Empire.

=== Campaigns against the Fatimid Caliphate ===
Once the internal strife was quelled, Basil turned his attention to the Empire's other enemies. The Byzantine civil wars had weakened the Empire's position in the east, and the gains of Nikephoros II and John I had nearly been lost to the Fatimid Caliphate. In 987–988, a seven-year truce with the Fatimids was signed; it stipulated an exchange of prisoners, the recognition of the Byzantine emperor as protector of Christians under Fatimid rule and of the Fatimid Caliph as protector of Muslims under Byzantine rule, and the replacement of the name of the Abbasid caliph with that of the Fatimid caliph in the Friday prayer in the mosque at Constantinople. This lasted until the long-time vizier Yaqub ibn Killis died in 991. Fatimid caliph Al-Aziz Billah chose to pursue a more aggressive stance in Syria and appointed Manjutakin as governor of Damascus.

=== Manjutakin's attacks, and Basil's first expedition to Syria ===
Encouraged by the defectors after the death of emir Sa'd al-Dawla, Al-Aziz decided to renew his attacks on the Hamdanid Emirate of Aleppo, a Byzantine protectorate, perhaps expecting Basil would not interfere. Manjutakin invaded the emirate, defeated a Byzantine force under the doux of Antioch Michael Bourtzes in June 992, and laid siege to Aleppo. The city easily resisted. In early 993, after thirteen months of campaigning, a lack of supplies forced Manjutakin to return to Damascus.

In 994, Manjutakin resumed his offensive and in September scored a major victory at the Battle of the Orontes against Bourtzes. Bourtzes' defeat forced Basil to intervene personally in the East; with his army, he rode through Asia Minor to Aleppo in sixteen days, arriving in April 995. Basil's sudden arrival and the exaggeration of his army's strength circulating in the Fatimid camp caused panic in the Fatimid army, especially because Manjutakin, expecting no threat, had ordered his cavalry horses to be dispersed around the city for pasture. Despite having a considerably larger and well-rested army, Manjutakin was at a disadvantage. He burned his camp and retreated to Damascus without battle. The Byzantines besieged Tripoli unsuccessfully and occupied Tartus, which they refortified and garrisoned with Armenian troops. Al-Aziz now prepared to take to the field in person against the Byzantines and initiated large-scale preparations but they were abandoned upon his death.

==== Second expedition to Syria, and peace ====
Warfare between the two powers continued as the Byzantines supported an anti-Fatimid uprising in Tyre. In 998, the Byzantines under Damian Dalassenos, the successor of Bourtzes, launched an attack on Apamea but the Fatimid general Jaysh ibn al-Samsama defeated them in battle on 19 July 998. This defeat drew Basil back into the conflict; he arrived in Syria in October 999 and remained there for three months. Basil's troops raided as far as Heliopolis, placed a garrison at Larissa, and burnt three minor forts in the vicinity of Abu Qubais, Masyath and Arca. The siege of Tripoli in December failed while Emesa was not threatened. Basil's attention was diverted to developments in Georgia following the murder of David III Kuropalates; he departed for Cilicia in January and dispatched another embassy to Cairo.

In 1000, a ten-year truce was concluded between the two states. For the remainder of the reign of Al-Hakim bi-Amr Allah (r. 996–1021), relations remained peaceful as al-Hakim was more interested in internal affairs. Even the acknowledgement of Fatimid suzerainty by Abu Muhammad Lu'lu' al-Kabir of Aleppo in 1004 and the Fatimid-sponsored installment of Aziz al-Dawla as the city's emir in 1017 did not lead to a resumption of hostilities, especially because al-Kabir continued to pay tribute to the Byzantines and al-Dawla quickly began acting as an independent ruler. Al-Hakim's persecution of Christians in his realm and especially the 1009 destruction of the Church of the Holy Sepulchre at his orders strained relations and, along with Fatimid interference in Aleppo, provided the main focus of Fatimid–Byzantine diplomatic relations until the late 1030s.

=== Conquest of Bulgaria ===
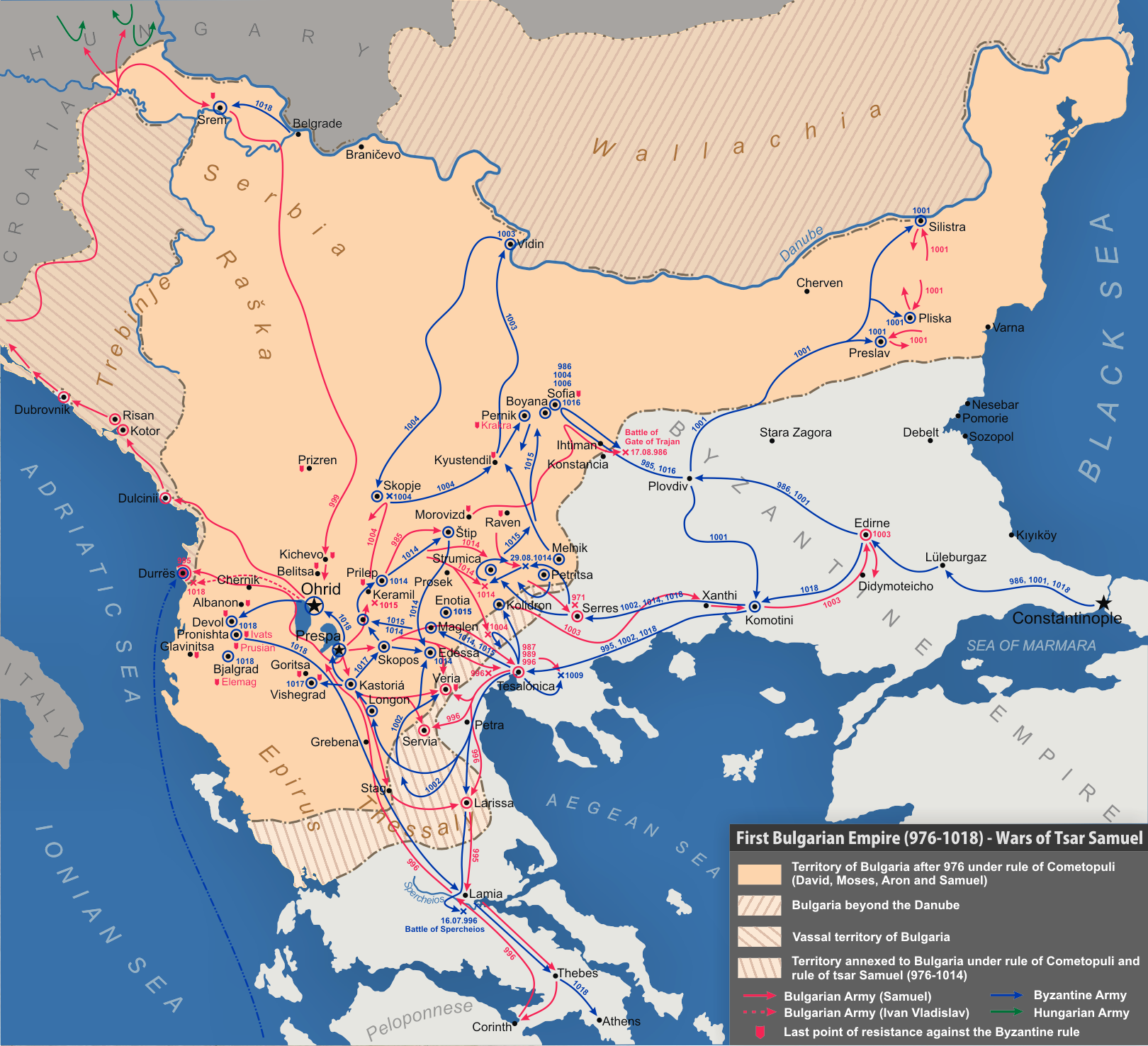
Military campaigns during the Byzantine-Bulgarian War.

Basil sought to restore former territories of the Byzantine Empire. At the start of the second millennium, he fought Samuel of Bulgaria, his greatest adversary. Bulgaria had been partly subjugated by John I after the invasion of Svyatoslav I of Kiev but parts of the country had remained outside Byzantine control under the leadership of Samuel and his brothers.

Because the Bulgars had been raiding Byzantine lands since 976, the Byzantine government sought to cause dissension among them by allowing the escape of their captive emperor Boris II of Bulgaria. This ploy failed so Basil used a respite from his conflict with the nobility to lead a 30,000-strong army into Bulgaria and besiege Sredets (Sofia) in 986. Taking losses and worried about the loyalty of some of his governors, Basil lifted the siege and returned for Thrace but he fell into an ambush and suffered a serious defeat at the Battle of the Gates of Trajan. Basil escaped with the help of his Varangian Guard and attempted to recover his losses by turning Samuel's brother Aron against him. Aron was tempted by Basil's offer of his sister Anna in marriage, but the negotiations failed when Aron discovered the bride he was sent was an imposter. By 987, Samuel had eliminated Aron. Another brother of Samuel, called David, was killed in 976 by the Vlachs, the guards of caravans, between Prespa and Kastoria. Although the titular emperor Roman of Bulgaria was captured in 991, Basil lost Moesia to the Bulgarians.

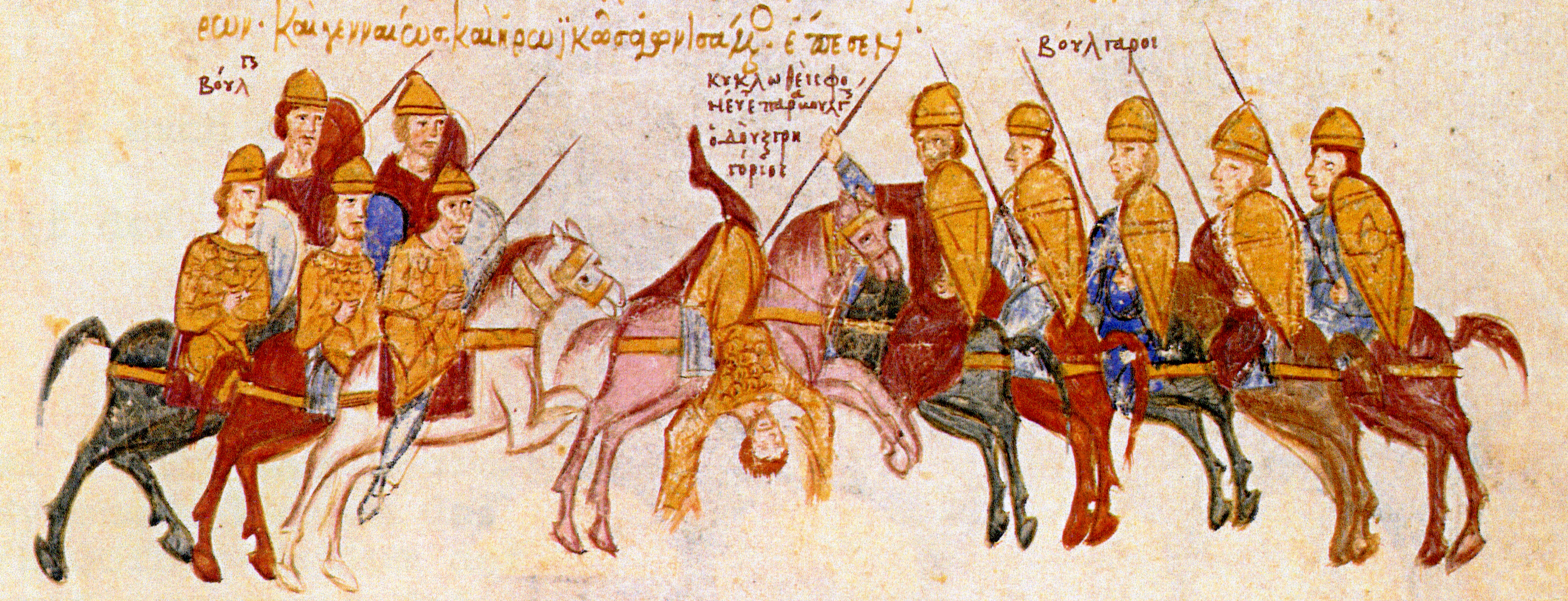
The Armenian prince Gregory Taronites is ambushed by the Bulgarians near Thessalonica.

While Basil was distracted with internal rebellions and recovering the military situation on his eastern frontier, Samuel had extended his rule from the Adriatic Sea to the Black Sea, recovering most of the territory that was controlled by Bulgaria before the invasion of Svyatoslav. He also conducted damaging raids into Byzantine territory as far as central Greece. In 996, the Byzantine general Nikephoros Ouranos defeated a Bulgarian army raid at the Battle of Spercheios in Thessaly. Samuel and his son Gabriel narrowly escaped capture.

Beginning in 1000, Basil was free to focus on a war of conquest against Bulgaria, which he fought with grinding persistence and strategic insight. In 1000, the Byzantine generals Nikephoros Xiphias and Theodorokanos took the former Bulgarian capital Great Preslav, and the towns Lesser Preslav and Pliskova. In 1001, Basil, operating from Thessalonica, regained control of Vodena, Verrhoia and Servia. The following year, he based his army in Philippopolis and occupied the length of the military road from the western Haemus Mountains to the Danube, cutting off communications between Samuel's Macedonian heartland and Paristrion (the lands south of the lower Danube). Following this success, Basil laid siege to Vidin, which fell after a prolonged resistance. Samuel reacted to the Byzantine campaign by launching a large-scale raid into the heart of Byzantine Thrace and took the major city of Adrianople by surprise.

After turning homeward with his extensive plunder, Samuel was intercepted near Skopje by a Byzantine army commanded by Basil, whose forces stormed the Bulgarian camp, defeating the Bulgarians and recovering the plunder from Adrianople. Skopje surrendered shortly after the battle, and Basil treated its governor Romanos with overt kindness. In 1005, the governor of Dyrrhachium Ashot Taronites surrendered his city to the Byzantines. The defection of Dyrrhachium completed the isolation of Samuel's core territories in the highlands of western Macedonia. Samuel was forced into an almost entirely defensive stance; he extensively fortified the passes and routes from the coastlines and valleys held by the Byzantines to the territory remaining in his possession. During the next few years, the Byzantine offensive slowed and no significant gains were made, although an attempt by the Bulgarians to counter-attack in 1009 was defeated at the Battle of Kreta, to the east of Thessalonica.

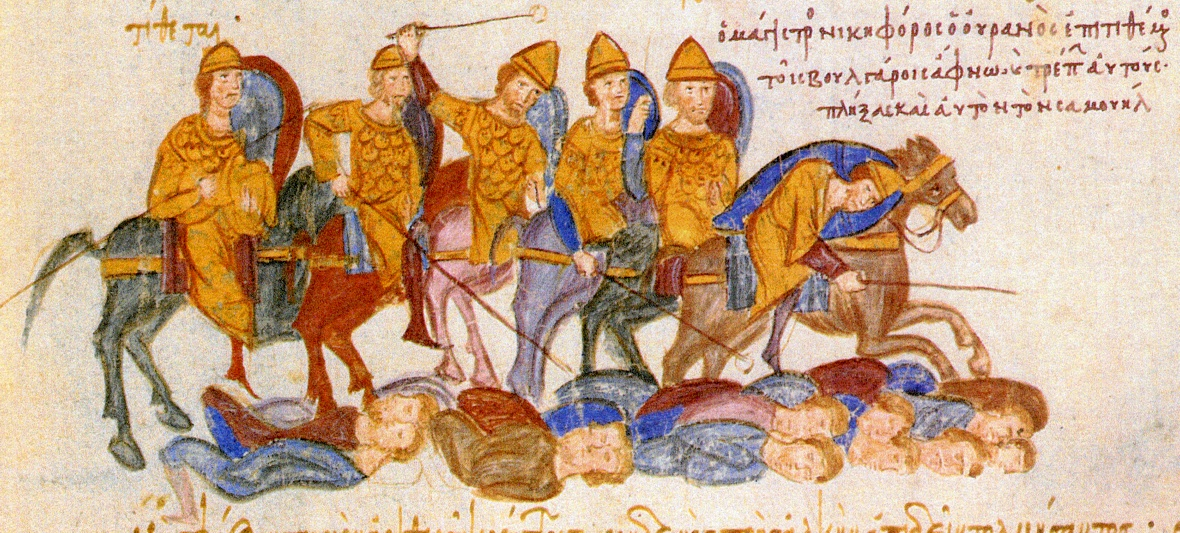
Byzantine victory over the Bulgarians at the Battle of Kleidion, from the Madrid Skylitzes

In 1014, Basil was ready to launch a campaign aimed at destroying Bulgarian resistance. On 29 July 1014, in the Battle of Kleidion, he and his general Nikephoros Xiphias outmaneuvered the Bulgarian army, which was defending one of the fortified passes. Samuel avoided capture through the valor of his son Gabriel. Having crushed the Bulgarians, Basil exacted his vengeance cruelly—he was said to have captured 15,000 prisoners and fully blinded 99 of every 100 men, leaving one one-eyed man in each cohort to lead the rest back to their ruler. A possible reason for this vengeance was that, in Byzantine eyes, the Bulgarians were rebels against their authority, and blinding was the usual punishment meted out to rebels. Samuel was struck down by the sight of his blinded army and died two days later on 6 October 1014 after suffering a stroke.

Bulgaria fought on for four more years, its resistance fired by Basil's cruelty, but it submitted in 1018. This submission was the result of continued military pressure and a successful diplomatic campaign aimed at dividing and suborning the Bulgarian leadership. This victory over the Bulgarians and the later submission of the Serbs fulfilled one of Basil's goals; the Empire regained its ancient Danubian frontier for the first time in 400 years.

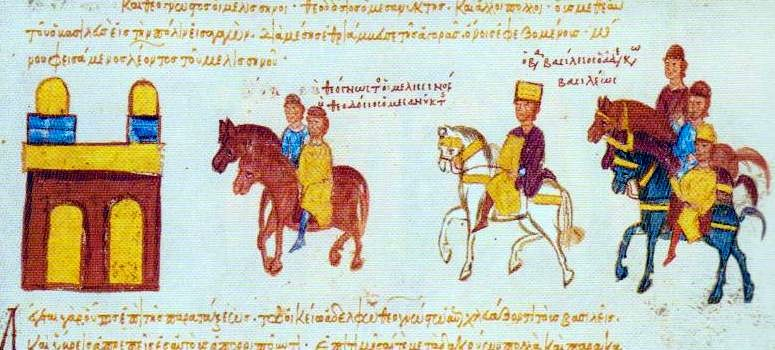
Triumph of Basil II through the Forum of Constantine, from the Madrid Skylitzes

The rulers of neighbouring Croatia, Krešimir III and Gojslav, who were previously allies of Bulgaria, accepted Basil's supremacy to avoid the same fate as Bulgaria; Basil warmly received their offers of vassalage and awarded them the honorary title of patrikios. Croatia remained a tributary state to Basil until his death in 1025. Before returning to Constantinople, Basil celebrated his triumph in Athens. He showed considerable statesmanship in his treatment of the defeated Bulgarians, giving many former Bulgarian leaders court titles, positions in provincial administration, and high commands in the army. In this way, he sought to absorb the Bulgarian elite into Byzantine society. Because Bulgaria did not have a monetary economy to the same extent as Byzantium, Basil decided to accept Bulgarian taxes in kind. Basil's successors reversed this policy, a decision that led to considerable Bulgarian discontent and rebellion later in the 11th century.

=== Khazar campaign ===
The Pontic steppes, c. 1015. The areas in blue are those possibly still under Khazar control. The positioning of the rump of the Bulgarian state in 1015 is incorrect on this map.

Although the Kievan Rus' had broken the power of the Khazar Khaganate in the 960s, the Byzantines had not been able to fully exploit the power vacuum and restore their dominion over Crimea and other areas around the Black Sea. In 1016, Byzantine armies in conjunction with Mstislav of Chernigov attacked the Crimea, much of which had fallen under the control of the Khazar successor kingdom of George Tzoul based at Kerch. Kedrenos reports that Tzoul was captured and the Khazar successor kingdom was destroyed. Subsequently, the Byzantines occupied southern Crimea.

=== Campaigns against Georgia ===
The integrity of the Byzantine Empire was threatened after a full-scale rebellion led by Bardas Skleros broke out in 976. After winning a series of battles, the rebels conquered Asia Minor. In the urgency of the situation, Georgian prince David III of Tao aided Basil; after a decisive loyalist victory at the Battle of Pankaleia, he was rewarded by lifetime rule of key imperial territories in eastern Asia Minor. David's rebuff of Basil in Bardas Phokas' revolt of 987, however, evoked Constantinople's distrust of the Georgian rulers. After the revolt's failure, David was forced to make Basil the legatee of his extensive possessions. In 1001, after the death of David of Tao, Basil inherited Tao, Phasiane and Speri. These provinces were then organized into the theme of Iberia with the capital at Theodosiopolis. This forced the successor Georgian Bagratid ruler Bagrat III to recognize the new rearrangement. Bagrat's son George I, however, inherited a longstanding claim to David's succession. George, who was young and ambitious, launched a campaign to restore the Kuropalates's succession to Georgia and occupied Tao in 1015–1016. He entered in an alliance with the Fatimid caliph of Egypt, al-Hakim, forcing Basil to refrain from an acute response to George's offensive. The Byzantines were also involved in a relentless war with the Bulgarians, limiting their actions to the west. As soon as Bulgaria was conquered in 1018 and al-Hakim was dead, Basil led his army against Georgia. Preparations for a larger-scale campaign against the Kingdom of Georgia were set, beginning with the re-fortification of Theodosiopolis.

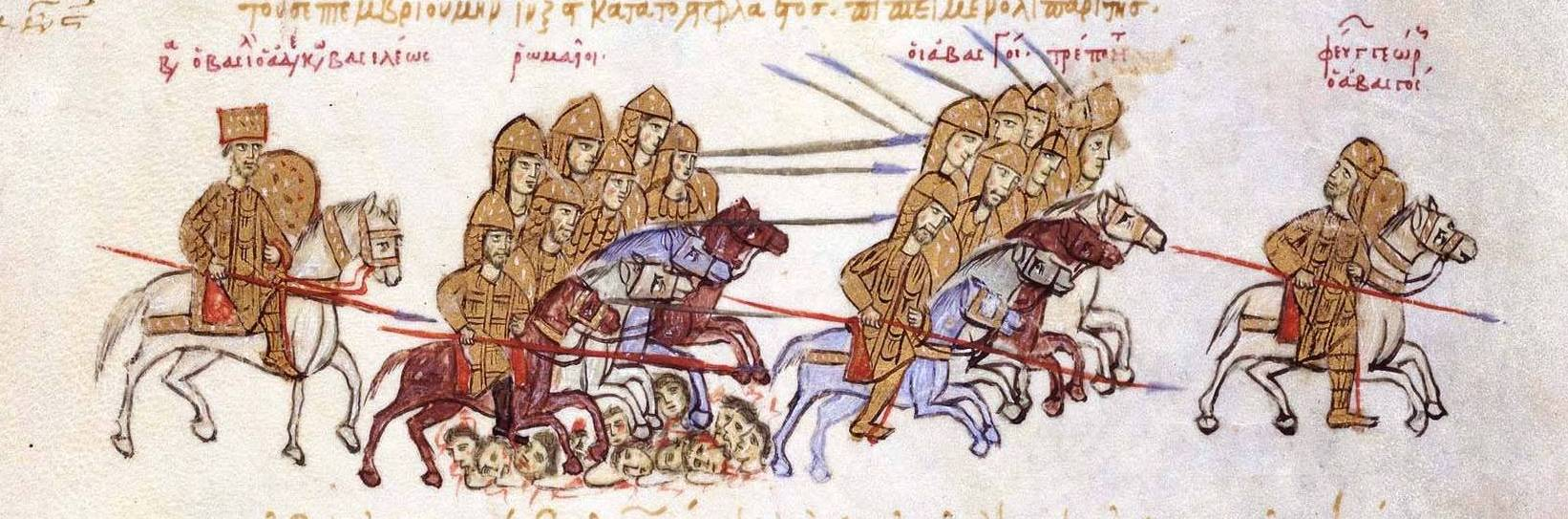
A miniature depicting the defeat of the Georgian king George I ("Georgios of Abasgia") by the Basil II. Madrid Skylitzes, fol. 195v.

In late 1021, Basil, at the head of a large Byzantine army reinforced by the Varangian Guard, attacked the Georgians and their Armenian allies, recovering Phasiane and continuing beyond the frontiers of Tao into inner Georgia. King George burned the city of Oltisi to prevent it falling to the enemy and retreated to Kola. A bloody battle was fought near the village Shirimni at Lake Palakazio on 11 September; the emperor won a costly victory, forcing George I to retreat northwards into his kingdom. Basil plundered the country and withdrew for winter to Trebizond.

Several attempts to negotiate the conflict failed. George received reinforcements from the Kakhetians and allied himself with the Byzantine commanders Nikephoros Phokas Barytrachelos and Nikephoros Xiphias in their abortive insurrection in the emperor's rear. In December, George's ally the Armenian king Senekerim of Vaspurakan, who was being harassed by the Seljuk Turks, surrendered his kingdom to the emperor. During early 1022, Basil launched a final offensive, defeating the Georgians at the Battle of Svindax. Menaced both by land and sea, George agreed to a treaty that handed over Tao, Phasiane, Kola, Artaan and Javakheti, and left his infant son Bagrat as Basil's hostage.

=== Fiscal policies ===
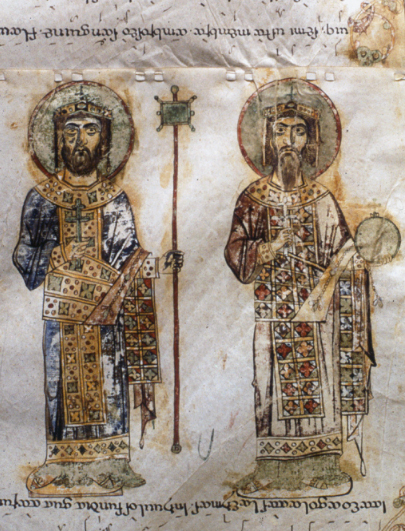
Basil II (left) and Constantine VIII (right) in a Bari Exultet roll, produced during Basil's late reign. (Note: These portraits of Basil II and Constantine VIII are generally believed to be reliable. Constantine is portrayed as having a longer beard, which coincides with how he's depicted in later coinage.)

In 992, Basil concluded a treaty with the Doge of Venice Pietro II Orseolo under terms reducing Venice's custom duties in Constantinople from 30 nomismata to 17 nomismata. In return, the Venetians agreed to transport Byzantine troops to southern Italy in times of war. (Note: The Edict on Maximum Prices issued during Diocletian's reign placed the cost on carpets from Cappadocia "at 3000 denarii, a price 30-fold the cost of a modios of wheat and thus approximately the value of perhaps two middle Byzantine nomismata".) According to one estimate, a Byzantine landowning farmer might expect a profit of 10.2 nomismata after paying dues for half of his best-quality land. Basil was popular with the country farmers, the class that produced most of his army's supplies and soldiers. To assure this continued, Basil's laws protected small agrarian property owners and lowered their taxes. Despite the almost constant wars, Basil's reign was considered an era of relative prosperity for the class.

Seeking to protect the lower and middle classes, Basil made ruthless war upon the system of immense estates in Asia Minor—which his predecessor Romanos I had endeavored to check—by executing a legal decree in January 996 that limited rights to property ownership. If the owner of an estate could prove that he claimed his estate prior to the Novels of Romanos, he would be allowed to keep it. If a person had illegally seized an estate following the Novels of Romanos, he would have his rights to the estate declared null and the legal owners could reclaim it. In 1002, Basil also introduced the allelengyon tax as a specific law obliging the dynatoi (wealthy landholders) to cover for the arrears of poorer tax-payers. Though it proved unpopular with the wealthier sections of Byzantine society, Basil did not abolish the tax; the emperor Romanos III abolished the allelengyon in 1028. By 1025, Basil—with an annual revenue of 7 million nomismata—was able to amass 14.4 million nomismata (or 200,000 pounds/90 tonnes of gold) for the Imperial treasury due to his prudent management. Despite his attempts to control the power of the aristocracy, they again took control of the government following his death.

=== Military policies ===
Basil II was praised by his army because he spent most of his reign campaigning with it rather than sending orders from Constantinople, as had most of his predecessors. This allowed his army to be largely supportive of him, often making his stance in political and church matters unquestionable. He lived the life of a soldier to the point of eating the same daily rations as the rest of the army. He also took the children of dead army officers under his protection and offered them shelter, food and education. Many of these children became his soldiers and officers, taking the places of their fathers. One of them, Isaac Komnenos, later became emperor himself.

Basil did not innovate in terms of military organization: in the conquered territories he introduced both the small themes or strategiai, centred around a fortress town, that were such a common feature of the 10th-century reconquests of the East under Phokas and Tzimiskes, as well as the extensive regional commands under a doux or katepano (Iberia in 1000, Asprakania or Upper Media in 1019/22, Paristrion in 1000/20, Bulgaria in 1018, and Sirmium in 1019). The exact size of the army under Basil II is unknown, but estimates put it as high as 110,000 men, excluding the imperial tagmata in Constantinople; a considerable force, compared with the nominal establishment force of c. 120,000 in the 9th–10th centuries, or the 150,000–160,000 of the field armies under Justinian I. At the same time, however, under Basil the practice began of relying on allied states—most notably Venice—for naval power, beginning the slow decline of the Byzantine navy during the 11th century.

=== Later life, death and burial ===
The Byzantine Empire at the death of Basil II in 1025

Basil II later secured the annexation of the sub-kingdoms of Armenia and a promise that its capital and surrounding regions would be willed to Byzantium following the death of its king Hovhannes-Smbat. In 1021, he also secured the cession of the Kingdom of Vaspurakan by its king Seneqerim-John, in exchange for estates in Sebasteia. Basil created a strongly fortified frontier in those highlands. Other Byzantine forces restored much of Southern Italy, which had been lost during the previous 150 years.

Basil was preparing a military expedition to recover the island of Sicily when he died on 15 December 1025, (Note: This is the universally accepted date for Basil's death. The date is found in the Skylitzes' (and Cedrenus') chronicle archived in the Bibliothèque nationale de France. Two latter copies, from the 15th century, give 12 December. Two others, from the 13th century, give 13 December. The 1839 edition of the CSHB uses the Paris manuscript, but forgets to translate the full date (Δεκεμβρίῳ γὰρ μηνί ιεʹ), a mistake that is repeated in the 2010 translation.) having had the longest reign among any Byzantine or Roman emperor. At the time of his death, the Empire stretched from southern Italy to the Caucasus and from the Danube to the Levant, which was its greatest territorial extent since the Muslim conquests four centuries earlier. Basil was to be buried in the last sarcophagus available in the rotunda of Constantine I in the Church of the Holy Apostles but he later asked his brother and successor Constantine VIII to be buried in the Church of St. John the Theologian (i.e., the Evangelist) at the Hebdomon Palace complex outside the walls of Constantinople. The epitaph on Basil's tomb celebrated his campaigns and victories. His final resting place carried the following inscription:

From the day that the King of Heaven called upon me to become the Emperor, the great overlord of the world, no one saw my spear lie idle. I stayed alert throughout my life and protected the children of the New Rome, valiantly campaigning both in the West and at the outposts of the East ... O, man, seeing now my tomb here, reward me for my campaigns with your prayers.

In 1260, during the unsuccessful Nicean Byzantine siege of Constantinople, then held by the Latin Empire, a corpse was found, upright in a corner of the Church of St. John the Evangelist, with a shepherd's flute placed in its mouth. An inscription allowed the Nicaean soldiers to identify the corpse as the remains of Basil II. The body of Basil II was transferred to the Monastery of the Saviour at Selymbria. The following year, Constantinople was recovered by the Byzantines.

== Legacy ==
=== Assessment ===
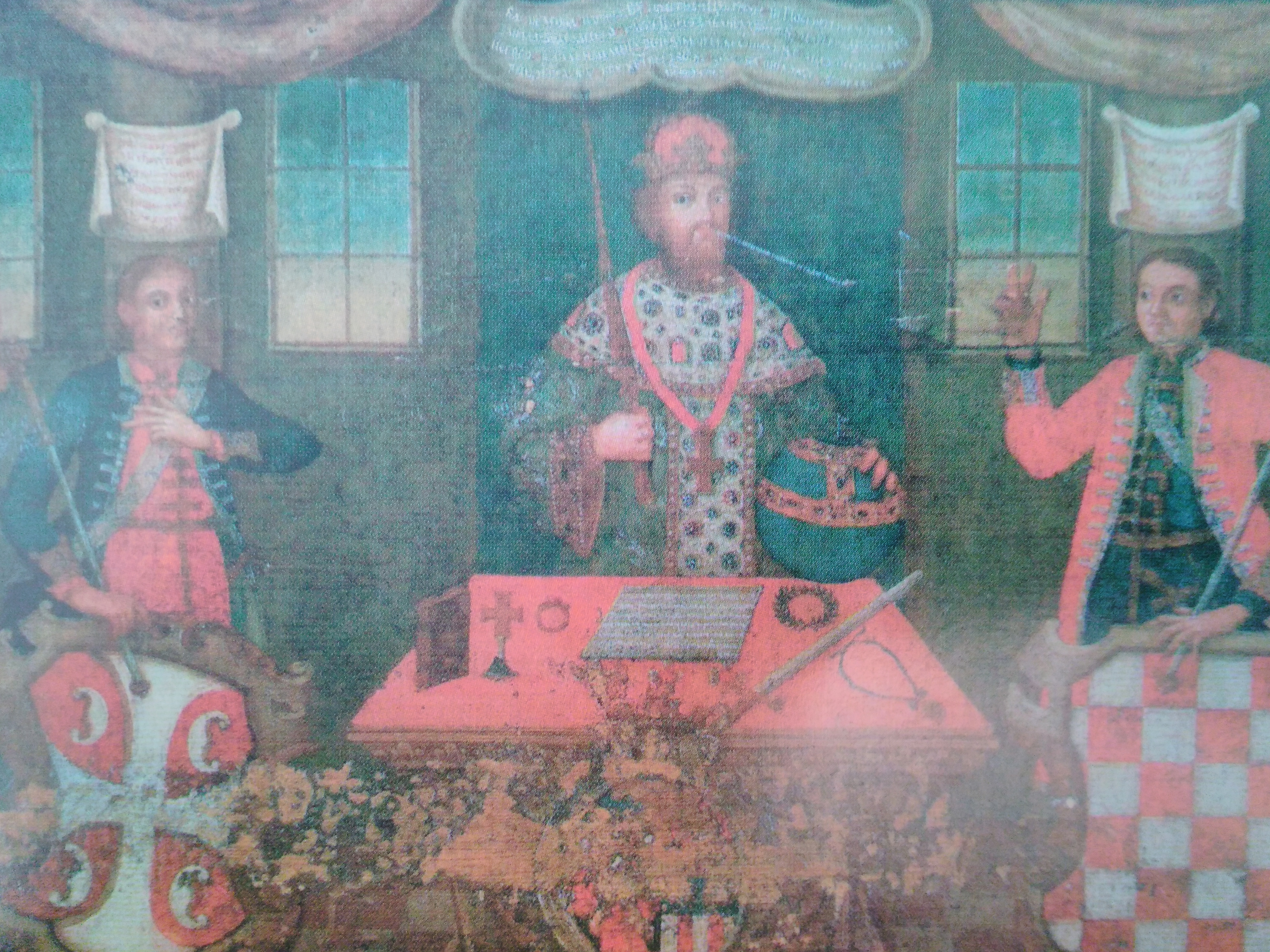
Personifications of Serbia and Croatia in front of Basil II, painting by Joakim Marković, 18th century.

An assessment of the reign in the eyes of the subsequent generations is given by Psellos:

He crushed rebellions, subdued the feudal landowners, conquered the enemies of the Empire, notably in the Danubian provinces and the East. Everywhere the might of Roman arms was respected and feared. The treasury was overflowing with the accumulated plunder of Basil's campaigns. Even the lamp of learning, despite the emperor's known indifference, was burning still, if somewhat dimly. The lot of ordinary folk in Constantinople must have been pleasant enough. For most of them life was gay and colourful, and if the city's defensive fortifications were at some points in disrepair they had no cause to dread attacks.

Basil II's reign is one of the most significant in Byzantine history. His constant military campaigns led to the zenith of Byzantine power in the Middle Ages. The restoration of the Danubian frontier helped establish a more stable and secure border for the empire in Europe, maintaining a stronger barrier against Hungarian and Pecheneg raiders. The conquest of Bulgaria and the submission of the South Slavs created relative peace for the empire's Balkan lands, keeping larger cities—including Constantinople—safe from the previously frequent sieges and looting. Basil's military experience that allowed him to eventually turn the war against Bulgaria in the Byzantine Empire's favor were gained through the revolts of Phokas and Skleros in Anatolia that challenged his throne and sometimes got close to deposing him. Basil's creation of the Varangian Guard provided him and his successors with an elite mercenary force capable of changing battle outcomes and boosting morale that became feared by the emperor's enemies.

At this time, the Macedonian Renaissance was taking effect, seeing the rise of classical Greek scholarship being assimilated into Christian art and the study of ancient Greek philosophy being widespread. The studies of these subjects, and the enlargement projects of the emperors, greatly expanded the library of the University of Constantinople, which again established itself as the main source of learning for its day. Though he was not a man of literature, Basil was a relatively pious ruler who involved himself in the construction of churches, monasteries and, to some extent, cities.

Literary works, eulogies and poems were made by the great cities of the Byzantine Empire that mostly tried to juxtapose the classic past of kingdoms and empires with the new expansion of Basil II in which he was compared with many important figures of the east such as Cyrus the Great and Artaxerxes. He was also particularly compared with Alexander the Great who was believed to be Basil's ancestor. Classical works such as "The Persians" by the ancient Greek tragedian Aeschylus were among the most recited in the empire during the expansion given the different confrontations against the caliphates that the Byzantines indiscriminately and classically called "Medes". Despite the great expansion during his reign, his military and non-scholastic character led him to be criticized and related to the ancient Spartan monarchs or tyrants who at that time were remembered for being men of action, cruelty and decision who, like Basil, paid little attention to promoting the arts or literary culture and preferred a military environment.

Basil II lacked heirs due to the "dearth of cousins found within the Macedonian dynasty", (Note: Basil's father; grandfather, Constantine VII; and great-grandfather, Leo VI, each had either no siblings or childless siblings. Basil himself was unmarried and childless, and his brother Constantine VIII's three daughters—Eudokia, Zoë and Theodora—all remained childless as well.) so he was succeeded by his brother Constantine and his family, who proved to be ineffective rulers. Nevertheless, fifty years of prosperity and intellectual growth followed because the funds of state were full, the borders were safe from intruders, and the Empire remained the most powerful political entity of the age. At the end of Basil II's reign, the Byzantine Empire had a population of approximately 12 million people.

Although they were beneficial, Basil's achievements were reversed very quickly. Many of the Georgian, Armenian and Fatimid campaigns were undone after the succession crisis and eventual civil war after the Battle of Manzikert in 1071. Because many of the empire's governors went to the capital with their soldiers to seize power after the capture of emperor Romanos IV, the Anatolian frontier was largely left undefended against the Seljuk Empire. The Normans permanently pushed the Byzantines from Southern Italy in April 1071.

According to the 19th-century historian George Finlay, Basil saw himself as "prudent, just, and devout; others considered him severe, rapacious, cruel, and bigoted. For Greek learning he cared little, and he was a type of the higher Byzantine moral character, which retained far more of its Roman than its Greek origin". The modern historian John Julius Norwich wrote of Basil: "No lonelier man ever occupied the Byzantine throne. And it is hardly surprising: Basil was ugly, dirty, coarse, boorish, philistine and almost pathologically mean. He was in short deeply un-Byzantine. He cared only for the greatness of his Empire. No wonder that in his hands it reached its apogee".

Bulgarian commentator Alexander Kiossev wrote in Understanding the Balkans: "The hero [of] a nation might be the villain of its neighbour ... The Byzantine emperor Basil the Murderer of Bulgarians, a crucial Greek pantheon figure, is no less important as [a] subject of hatred for our national mythology".

=== Depictions in literature ===
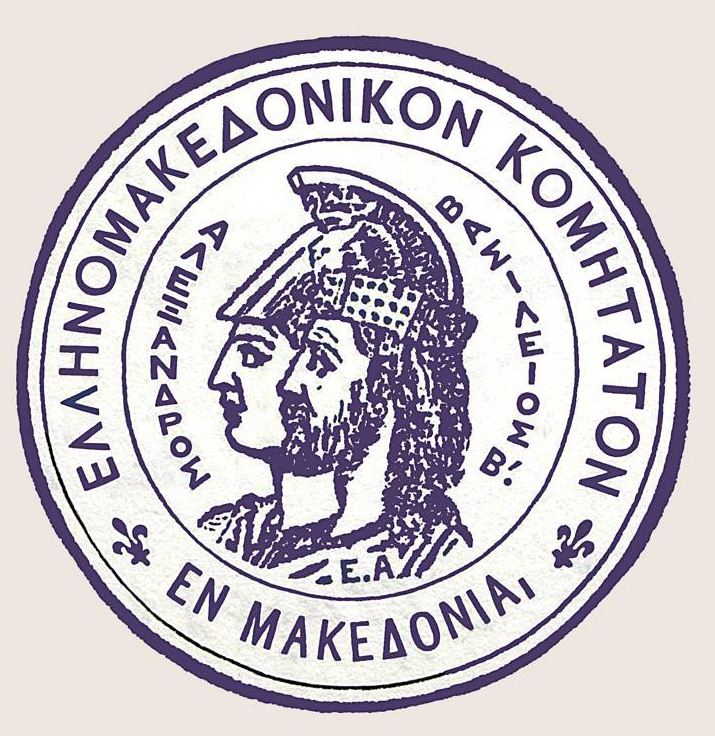
Seal of the Greek Macedonian Committee during the Greek Struggle for Macedonia, depicting Basil II (front) and Alexander the Great

- During the 20th century in Greece, interest in Basil II led to a number of biographies and historical novels about him. One of these is Basil Bulgaroktonos (1964) by historical fiction writer Kostas Kyriazis. Written as a sequel to his previous work Theophano (1963) which focuses on Basil's mother, it examines Basil's life through three fictional narrators and has been continuously reprinted since 1964. Rosemary Sutcliff's 1976 historical fiction novel Blood Feud depicts Basil II from the point of view of a member of his recently created Varangian Guard.
- Penelope Delta's second novel Ton Kairo tou Voulgaroktonou (In the Years of the Bulgar-Slayer) is also set during the reign of Basil II. It was inspired by correspondence with the historian Gustave Schlumberger, a renowned specialist on the Byzantine Empire, and published in the early years of the 20th century, a time when the Struggle for Macedonia again set Greeks and Bulgarians in bitter enmity with each other.
- Ion Dragoumis, who was Delta's lover and was deeply involved in that struggle, in 1907 published the book Martyron kai Iroon Aima (Martyrs' and Heroes' Blood), which is resentful towards anything remotely Bulgarian. He urges Greeks to follow the example of Basil II: "Instead of blinding so many people, Basil should have better killed them instead. On one hand these people would not suffer as eyeless survivors, on the other the sheer number of Bulgarians would have diminished by 15 000, which is something very useful." Later in the book, Dragoumis foresees the appearance of "new Basils" who would "cross the entire country and will look for Bulgarians in mountains, caves, villages and forests and will make them flee in refuge or kill them".
- Basil Basileus is a comic book series by Theocharis Spyros and Chrysa Sakel. The plot and illustration is based on academic bibliography. The story is set in the early years of Basil II, from the time of John I Tzimiskes and the formation of the Varangian Guard until the final years of Basil II.

== Genealogy ==
Basil's immediate family and predecessors

Constantine VII | Helena Lekapene
John I Tzimiskes | Theodora | Romanos II | Theophano | Nikephoros II Phokas
Basil II | Constantine VIII | Anna

== Bibliography ==
Primary sources

- Leo the Deacon (c. 1000), History
  - Talbot, Alice-Mary; Sullivan, Dennis F., eds. (2005). The History of Leo the Deacon. Washington, DC: Dumbarton Oaks. ISBN 978-0-88402-324-1.
- Michael Psellos (c. 1078), Chronographia
  - Sewter, Edgar Robert Ashton, ed. (1953). The Chronographia of Michael Psellus. New Haven, CN: Yale University Press. OCLC 422765673. Archived from the original on 14 August 2014.
- John Skylitzes (c. 1080), Synopsis of Histories.
  - Wortley, John, ed. (2010). John Skylitzes: A Synopsis of Byzantine History, 811–1057. Cambridge: Cambridge University Press. ISBN 978-0-521-76705-7.
  - Thurn, Hans, ed. (1973). Ioannis Scylitzae, Synopsis historiarum. Berlin: De Gruyter. ISBN 978-3110022858.

Secondary sources

- Antonopoulou, Theodora; Kotzabassi, Sofia; Loukaki, Marina, eds. (2015). Myriobiblos: Essays on Byzantine Literature and Culture. Walter de Gruyter GmbH & Co KG. ISBN 978-1501501562.
- Ash, John (1995). A Byzantine Journey. I.B. Tauris & Co. Ltd. ISBN 978-1845113070.
- Beaton, Roderick (1999). An Introduction to Modern Greek Literature. Oxford University Press. ISBN 978-0198159742.
- Blaum, Paul A. (1994). The Days of the Warlords: A History of the Byzantine Empire, A.D. 969–991. University Press of America. ISBN 978-0-8191-9657-6.
- Bonfil, Robert (2009). History and Folklore in a Medieval Jewish Chronicle: The Family Chronicle of Aḥima'az Ben Paltiel. Brill. ISBN 978-9004173859.
- Blöndal, Sigfús; Benedikz, Benedikt (2007). The Varangians of Byzantium. Cambridge University Press. ISBN 978-0521035521.
- Bréhier, Louis (1977). The life and death of Byzantium. North-Holland Pub. Co. p. 127. ISBN 978-0720490084.
- Brubaker, Leslie; Tougher, Shaun, eds. (2016). Approaches to the Byzantine Family. Routledge. ISBN 978-1317180012.
- Bury, John Bagnell (1911). "Basil II." . In Chisholm, Hugh (ed.). Encyclopædia Britannica. Vol. 3 (11th ed.). Cambridge University Press.
- Cartwright, Mark (9 November 2017). "Basil II". World History Encyclopedia.
- Cartwright, Mark (16 January 2018a). "Romanos I". World History Encyclopedia.
- Cartwright, Mark (19 January 2018b). "Michael II". World History Encyclopedia.
- Cartwright, Mark (1 February 2018c). "1204: The Sack of Constantinople". World History Encyclopedia.
- Charanis, Peter (1963). The Armenians in the Byzantine Empire. Lisbon: Fundação Calouste Gulbenkian Armenian Library. OCLC 17186882.
- Cooper, Eric J.; Decker, Michael (2012). Life and Society in Byzantine Cappadocia. Palgrave Macmillan. ISBN 978-0230361065.
- Cross, Samuel H.; Morgilevski, H. V.; Conant, K. J. (October 1936). "The Earliest Mediaeval Churches of Kiev". Speculum. 11 (4): 477–499. doi:10.2307/2848541. JSTOR 2848541. S2CID 162563311.
- Danforth, Loring (20 July 1998). "Macedonian Question". Encyclopedia Britannica.
- Diehl, Charles (1927). Byzantine portraits. A.A. Knopf. OCLC 1377097.
- Dragoumis, Ion (1907). Martyron kai Iroon Aima [Martyrs' and Heroes' Blood] (in Greek). Pelekanos. ISBN 978-9604003235.
- Durant, W.; Durant, A. (1950). The Story of Civilization: The age of Faith; A History of Medieval Civilization – Christian, Islamic and Judaic – from Constantine to Dante: A.D. 325–1300. Simon and Schuster. OCLC 245829181.
- Fine, John V. A. Jr. (1991) [1983]. The Early Medieval Balkans: A Critical Survey from the Sixth to the Late Twelfth Century. Ann Arbor: University of Michigan Press. ISBN 0-472-08149-7.
- Finlay, George (1856). "Book II: Chapter 2 § 2, Basil II (Bulgaroktonos), A.D. 976–1025". History of the Byzantine Empire from DCCXVI to MLVII (2nd ed.). W. Blackwood.
- Foss, Clive (2005). "Emperors named Constantine". Revue Numismatique (in French). 6 (161): 93–102. doi:10.3406/numi.2005.2594.
- Garland, Lynda (2002). Byzantine Empresses: Women and Power in Byzantium AD 527–1204. Routledge. ISBN 978-1134756384.
- Gibbon, Edward (1788). The History of the Decline and Fall of the Roman Empire. Vol. V. W. Strahan and T. Cadell.
- Goodacre, Hugh George (1957). A handbook of the coinage of the Byzantine Empire. Spink. p. 203. OCLC 2705898.
- Gregory, Timothy E. (2005). A History of Byzantium. Blackwell Publishing. ISBN 978-0-631-23512-5.
- Grierson, Philip (1962). "The Tombs and Obits of the Byzantine Emperors". Dumbarton Oaks Papers. 16. doi:10.2307/1291157. JSTOR 1291157.
- Haldon, John (1999). Warfare, State and Society in the Byzantine World, 565–1204. London: UCL Press. ISBN 1-85728-495-X.
- Harris, Jonathan (2015). The Lost World of Byzantium. Yale University Press. ISBN 978-0300178579.
- Head, Constance (1980). "Physical Descriptions of the Emperors in Byzantine Historical Writing". Byzantion. 50 (1). Peeters Publishers: 226–240.
- Herrin, Judith (2013). Unrivalled Influence: Women and Empire in Byzantium. Princeton: Princeton University Press. ISBN 978-0691153216.
- Holmes, Catherine (1 April 2003). "Basil II". De Imperatoribus Romanis. Archived from the original on 13 March 2015.
- Holmes, Catherine (2005). Basil II and the Governance of Empire (976–1025). New York: Oxford University Press. ISBN 978-0199279685.
- Hussey, Joan Mervyn (20 July 1998). "Basil II". Encyclopedia Britannica.
- Jeffreys, C., ed. (2016). "Emperor Basileios II Boulgaroktonos". Prosopography of the Byzantine World. King's College London. ISBN 978-1-908951-20-5. Archived from the original on 21 January 2023.
- Kaldellis, Anthony (2017). Streams of Gold, Rivers of Blood: The Rise and Fall of Byzantium, 955 A.D. to the First Crusade. Oxford University Press. ISBN 978-0190253226.
- Kazhdan, Alexander, ed. (1991). The Oxford Dictionary of Byzantium. Oxford and New York: Oxford University Press. ISBN 0-19-504652-8.
- Kennedy, Hugh (2004) [1986]. The Prophet and the Age of the Caliphates: The Islamic Near East from the 6th to the 11th Century (Second ed.). Harlow: Longman. ISBN 978-0-582-40525-7.
- Kiossev, Alexander (15 October 2000). Heroes Against Sweets. The Split of National and "Anthropological" cultures in South-East Europe. Understanding the Balkans: 13–16 October 2000, Hotel Belvi in Ohrid, Republic of Macedonia. Archived from the original on 19 December 2007.
- Kühn, Hans-Joachim (1991). Die byzantinische Armee im 10. und 11. Jahrhundert: Studien zur Organisation der Tagmata (in German). Vienna: Fassbaender Verlag. ISBN 3-9005-38-23-9.
- Kyriazis, Kostas (1964). Basil Bulgaroktonus (in Greek).
- Lawler, Jennifer (2011). Encyclopedia of the Byzantine Empire. McFarland. ISBN 978-0786466160.
- Laiou, Angeliki E., ed. (2007). The Economic History of Byzantium. Dumbarton Oaks. ISBN 978-0884022886. Archived from the original on 3 November 2019.
- Leong, Albert (1997). The Millennium: Christianity and Russia, A.D. 988–1988. St Vladimirs Seminary Press. ISBN 978-0881410808.
- Lev, Yaacov (1995). "The Fatimids and Byzantium, 10th–12th Centuries". Graeco-Arabica. 6: 190–208. OCLC 183390203.
- Lilie, Ralph-Johannes; Winkelmann, Friedhelm (1998). Prosopographie der mittelbyzantinischen Zeit (in German). De Gruyter. ISBN 978-3110151794.
- Lopez, Robert Sabatino (20 July 1998). "Constantine VII Porphyrogenitus". Encyclopedia Britannica.
- Magdalino, Paul (2003). Byzantium in the Year 1000. Brill. ISBN 978-9004120976.
- Magdalino, Paul (2004), "The Byzantine Empire, 1118–1204", The New Cambridge Medieval History, Cambridge University Press, pp. 611–643, doi:10.1017/chol9780521414111.024, ISBN 978-1139054034
- Makris, Georgios (2006). "Allelengyon". Brill's New Pauly. doi:10.1163/1574-9347_bnp_e116010.
- Mango, Cyril (2002). The Oxford History of Byzantium. Oxford University Press. ISBN 978-0198140986.
- McCabe, Joseph (1913). The Empresses of Constantinople. R.G. Badger. OCLC 188408.
- Miller, William (1921). Essays on the Latin Orient. Cambridge: Cambridge University Press.
- Moennin, Ulrich (2016). "6 a Hero Without Borders: 1 Alexander the Great in Ancient, Byzantine and Modern Greek Tradition". A Hero Without Borders: 1 Alexander the Great in Ancient, Byzantine and Modern Greek Tradition. Brill. pp. 159–189. doi:10.1163/9789004307728_008. ISBN 978-9004307728.
- Morson, Gary Saul (20 July 1998). "Russian literature". Encyclopedia Britannica.
- Nicol, Donald M. (1988). Byzantium and Venice: A Study in Diplomatic and Cultural Relations. Cambridge: Cambridge University Press. ISBN 0-521-34157-4.
- Norwich, John Julius (1981). A History of Venice. Allen Lane. ISBN 978-0241953044.
- Norwich, John Julius (1991). Byzantium: the Apogee. London: Penguin. ISBN 978-0670802524.
- Norwich, John Julius (1997). History of Byzantium. Alfred A. Knopf. ISBN 978-0679450887.
- Ringrose, Kathryn M. (2004). The Perfect Servant. University of Chicago Press. ISBN 978-0226720159.
- Rogers, Clifford J. (2010). The Oxford Encyclopedia of Medieval Warfare and Military Technology, Volume 1. Oxford University Press. ISBN 978-0195334036.
- Runciman, Steven (1988) [1929]. The Emperor Romanus Lecapenus and His Reign: A Study of Tenth-Century Byzantium. Cambridge, UK: Cambridge University Press. ISBN 0-521-35722-5.
- Schulman, Jana K., ed. (2002). The Rise of the Medieval World, 500–1300: A Biographical Dictionary. Greenwood Publishing Group. ISBN 978-0313308178.
- Shephard, Jonathan (2000). "Byzantium expanding, 944–1025". In Reuter, Timothy (ed.). The New Cambridge Medieval History, Volume 3, c.900–c.1024. Cambridge: Cambridge University Press. pp. 586–604. ISBN 978-1-13905572-7.
- Stephenson, P.; Hoppenbrouwers, P. C. M. (30 July 2014). "The Byzantine State and the Dynatoi" (PDF). Leiden University Repository. Archived (PDF) from the original on 6 December 2019.
- Schreiner, Peter (1975). Die byzantinischen Kleinchroniken. Corpus Fontium Historiae Byzantinae. Vienna: ÖAW. ISBN 978-3-7001-0206-9.
- Ševčenko, Ihor (1968). "New Cambridge History of the Byzantine Empire – The Cambridge Medieval History, Volume IV: The Byzantine Empire, Part 1: Byzantium and Its Neighbours". Slavic Review. 27 (1): 109–118. doi:10.2307/2493917. ISSN 0037-6779. JSTOR 2493917. S2CID 251234248.
- Spatharákīs, Iōánnīs Spatharákīs (1976). The Portrait in Byzantine Illuminated Manuscripts. Brill. ISBN 978-9004047839.
- Stephenson, Paul (2000). Byzantium's Balkan Frontier. Cambridge University Press. ISBN 978-0521770170.
- Stephenson, Paul (2010). The Legend of Basil the Bulgar-Slayer. New York: Cambridge University Press. ISBN 978-0521815307.
- Stevenson, William B. (1926). "Chapter VI. Islam in Syria and Egypt (750–1100)". In Bury, John Bagnell (ed.). The Cambridge Medieval History: Contest of Empire and Papacy. Vol. V. New York: The Macmillan Company. pp. 242–264.
- Sutcliff, Rosemary (1976). Blood Feud. Random House. ISBN 978-1448173013.
- Sue, Caryl (18 June 2014). "Great Schism". National Geographic. Archived from the original on 7 February 2021.
- "Civilization VI – First Look: Basil II Leads Byzantium". Civilization.
- Talbot, Alice-Mary; Johnson, Scott Fitzgerald (2012). Miracle Tales from Byzantium. Harvard University Press. ISBN 978-0674059030.
- "Constantine VIII". Encyclopedia Britannica. 20 July 1998.
- Thomas, John Philip; Thomas, John Prescott (1987). Private Religious Foundations in the Byzantine Empire. Dumbarton Oaks. ISBN 978-0884021643.
- Treadgold, Warren (1997). A History of the Byzantine State and Society. Stanford, California: Stanford University Press. ISBN 0-8047-2630-2.
- Manafis, Panagiotis (2020). (Re)writing History in Byzantium: A Critical Study of Collections of Historical Excerpts. Routledge. ISBN 978-1000068757.
- Vogt, Albert (1923a). "Chapter III. The Macedonian Dynasty from 867 to 976 A.D. (717–867)". The Cambridge Medieval History, Vol. IV: The Eastern Roman Empire (717–1453). Cambridge University Press. pp. 49–82. OCLC 490614728.
- Vogt, Albert (1923b). "Chapter IV. The Macedonian Dynasty from 976 to 1057 A.D. (717–867)". The Cambridge Medieval History, Vol. IV: The Eastern Roman Empire (717–1453). Cambridge University Press. pp. 83–118. OCLC 490614728.
- Whittow, Mark (1996). The Making of Byzantium, 600–1025. Berkeley and Los Angeles, California: University of California Press. ISBN 978-0-520-20496-6.

Basil II Macedonian Dynasty Born: 958 Died: 15 December 1025
Regnal titles
| Preceded by Romanos II | Byzantine emperor 960–1025 with Romanos II in 960–963, Nikephoros II in 963–969 and John I in 969–976 as senior emperors, and Constantine VIII as junior co-emperor | Succeeded by Constantine VIII |
