= Nikephoros Phokas Barytrachelos =

Byzantine aristocrat and magnate (965–1022)

- Native name: Νικηφόρος Φωκᾶς
- Born: 965
- Died: 15 August 1022 (aged 56–57)
- Noble family: Phokas
- Father: Bardas Phokas the Younger
- Occupation: Aristocrat and magnate

Nikephoros Phokas (Greek: Νικηφόρος Φωκᾶς, c. 965 – 15 August 1022), surnamed Barytrachelos (Βαρυτράχηλος, "heavy-neck"; Armenian: Cṙ[a]viz, Georgian: წარვეზი Ts'arvezi, "wry-neck"), was a Byzantine aristocrat and magnate, the last major member of the Phokas family to try to claim the imperial throne. He was a son of the general Bardas Phokas the Younger and great-nephew of Emperor Nikephoros II Phokas, and played an active role in his father's failed rebellion against Basil II in 987–989. After the death of his father, he sought and received Basil's pardon. Nothing further is known of him until 1022 when, along with the general Nikephoros Xiphias, he launched another rebellion. The revolt gathered widespread support, but mistrust between the two leaders led to Phokas' assassination by Xiphias on 15 August 1022. The rebellion collapsed quickly after that.

== Life ==
Nikephoros Phokas Barytrachelos was a son of the general Bardas Phokas the Younger, and had one older brother, Leo. In spring 970, following the murder of Barytrachelos's great-uncle Emperor Nikephoros II Phokas by John I Tzimiskes, his father tried to raise a rebellion against the new regime in the family's base at Cappadocia. Tzimiskes dispatched his lieutenant Bardas Skleros against Bardas Phokas. Skleros was able to lure away many of Phokas' supporters, until he was forced to surrender. Although not explicitly mentioned in the sources, Nikephoros probably shared his father's fortune, being exiled to the Aegean island of Chios with the rest of his family.

=== Role in the revolts of Bardas Phokas and Bardas Skleros ===
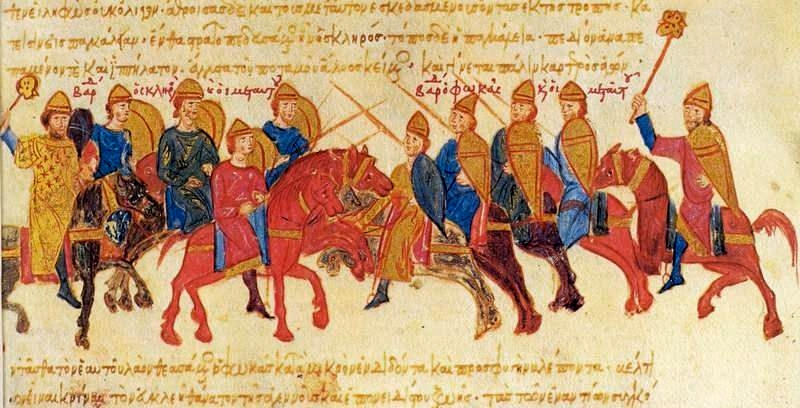
Clash between the armies of Skleros and Phokas, miniature from the Madrid Skylitzes

In 978, after Tzimiskes's death and the rise of Basil II to the throne, Bardas Phokas was recalled to lead the imperial forces against his old rival Bardas Skleros, who had rebelled and seized much of Asia Minor. After early reverses, the loyalist forces under Phokas proved victorious in spring 979, forcing Skleros to flee to Byzantium's eastern Muslim neighbours, finding refuge in the Buyid court at Baghdad.

In 987, however, Bardas Skleros was released from Baghdad and tried to raise another revolt. He contacted Bardas Phokas for a common undertaking against Basil II, but Phokas deceived and imprisoned Skleros, before finally launching his own uprising by proclaiming himself emperor in August/September 987. It is here that Nikephoros is named for the first time in the sources: his father sent him to David III of Tao to secure military aid, and to confront the loyalist general Gregory Taronites, who had landed in the Phokades's rear at Trebizond and had raised an army of Armenians in the eastern provinces. Nikephoros secured 1,000 Georgian soldiers from David and defeated Taronites, but soon after that news reached him of the death of his father at the Battle of Abydos on 13 April 989. Bardas Phokas's demise led to the immediate collapse of the rebellion: the Georgians returned to their country, and Nikephoros's troops dispersed to their homes. Nikephoros fled to the fortress of Tyropoion, where his mother resided and where the imprisoned Bardas Skleros was held. Along with his brother Leo, Nikephoros now supported Skleros's candidacy as emperor, but the latter, old and weary, preferred to give up the struggle and submit to the emperor in exchange for leniency. Like Bardas Skleros, Nikephoros received a pardon, and was allowed to retain his privileges. Leo on the other hand tried to resist from his base at Antioch, but the city's inhabitants surrendered him to Basil.

=== Rebellion with Nikephoros Xiphias and death ===
Nothing is heard of Nikephoros Phokas Barytrachelos until the summer of 1022, when he conspired with the general Nikephoros Xiphias against Basil II, who since spring had been engaged in a campaign against the Georgian king George I. The two conspirators aimed to overthrow Basil and have one of them replace him, but the issue of who would have precedence was unresolved, and would lead to the rebellion's quick downfall. Although Xiphias held the prestigious post of strategos of the Anatolic Theme and Phokas held no office but the title of patrikios, according to the report of the contemporary Christian Arab historian Yahya of Antioch, great numbers of aristocrats flocked to him due to his family's influence, provoking Xiphias's envy.

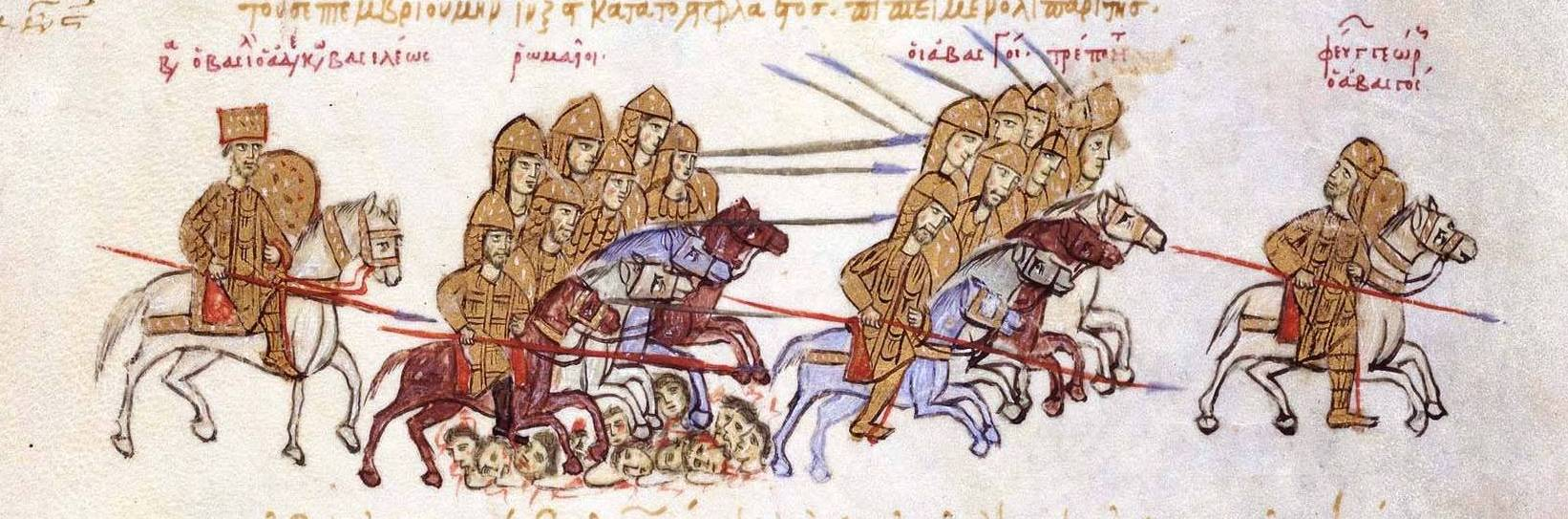
Basil II defeats the Georgians, miniature from the Madrid Skylitzes

The rebellion of the two men was particularly threatening to the emperor, as it took control over Cappadocia and threatened to cut off his rear and leave him stranded between two enemies. Indeed, the conspirators are said to have been in contact with George I for that purpose. Basil first withdrew to the safety of the fortress of Mazdat, and according to John Skylitzes sent an envoy to the rebel leaders aiming to sow distrust between them, while according to Yahya the emperor appointed as the new governor of the Anatolic Theme Theophylact Dalassenos and sent him to suppress the revolt. Whether the envoy accomplished his task is unknown, but on 15 August 1022, Xiphias arranged a meeting with Phokas, where the latter was murdered by one of Xiphias's servants. Armenian sources however report, rather dubiously, that Phokas was killed by the former king of Vaspurakan, Senekerim-Hovhannes, or his son David, or one of their followers. The severed head was sent to Basil, who mounted it on a stake and put it on public display at Mazdat.

Following the death of Phokas, the rebellion collapsed, and Xiphias was arrested and forced to become a monk. Released from the threat to his rear, Basil II swiftly and decisively defeated George I, and imposed his terms on him. The other supporters of the uprising were imprisoned and released in 1025, after the death of Basil II and the succession of his younger brother, Constantine VIII. In 1026, however, Constantine VIII accused the last surviving member of the once great family, Bardas Phokas (a son of Nikephoros Barytrachelos), of plotting against the throne, and had him blinded.

== Sources ==
- Cheynet, Jean-Claude (1990). Pouvoir et Contestations à Byzance (963–1210) (in French). Paris: Publications de la Sorbonne. ISBN 978-2-85944-168-5.
- Kazhdan, Alexander, ed. (1991). The Oxford Dictionary of Byzantium. Oxford and New York: Oxford University Press. ISBN 0-19-504652-8.
- Lilie, Ralph-Johannes; Ludwig, Claudia; Pratsch, Thomas; Zielke, Beate (2013). Prosopographie der mittelbyzantinischen Zeit Online. Berlin-Brandenburgische Akademie der Wissenschaften. Nach Vorarbeiten F. Winkelmanns erstellt (in German). Berlin and Boston: De Gruyter.
- Treadgold, Warren (1997). A History of the Byzantine State and Society. Stanford, California: Stanford University Press. ISBN 0-8047-2630-2.
- Whittow, Mark (1996). The Making of Byzantium, 600–1025. Berkeley and Los Angeles, California: University of California Press. ISBN 978-0-520-20496-6.
