= Bardas Phokas the Younger =

Byzantine general (died 989)

Bardas Phokas
- Born: c. 940; Cappadocia, Byzantine Empire (modern-day Turkey)
- Died: April 13, 989; Abydos, Opsikion, Byzantine Empire (modern-day Çanakkale, Turkey)
- Military career
- Allegiance: Byzantine Empire
- Rank: General
- Nickname: Phocas
- Conflicts: Arab–Byzantine wars; Battle of Pankaleia; Syrian Campaigns of Bardas Phokas the Younger; Rebellion of Bardas Phokas the Younger

Bardas Phokas (or Phocas; Greek: Βάρδας Φωκᾶς; c. 940 – 13 April 989) was a Byzantine general who took a conspicuous part in three revolts for and against the ruling Macedonian dynasty.

== First rebellion ==
Bardas was a scion of the Phokas family, the most prominent Byzantine aristocratic clan in the 10th century. His father Leo Phokas the Younger was a curopalates and brother to the Emperor Nikephoros II Phokas. Even as a young man, Bardas gained a reputation for his great expertise in the science of war:

According to the historians, this man Bardas reminded people of his uncle, the emperor Nikephoros, for he was always wrapped in gloom, and watchful, capable of foreseeing all eventualities, of comprehending everything at a glance. Far from being ignorant of warlike manoeuvres, he was thoroughly versed in every type of siege warfare, every trick of ambush, every tactic of pitched battle. In the matter of physical prowess, moreover, Bardas was more energetic and virile than Sclerus. Any man who received a blow from his hand was dead straightway, and whole armies trembled even when he shouted from afar. — Michael Psellos, Chronographia.

If his military career was quick to peak, it was even quicker to collapse. Upon his uncle's death in 969, Phokas and his family rebelled against the new emperor and their own cousin, John I Tzimiskes. Bardas was proclaimed emperor by troops stationed at Caesarea, but their rebellion was extinguished by another skilled commander, Bardas Skleros. Phokas and his relatives were captured and exiled to the island of Chios, where he would spend the following seven years.

== Phokas versus Skleros ==
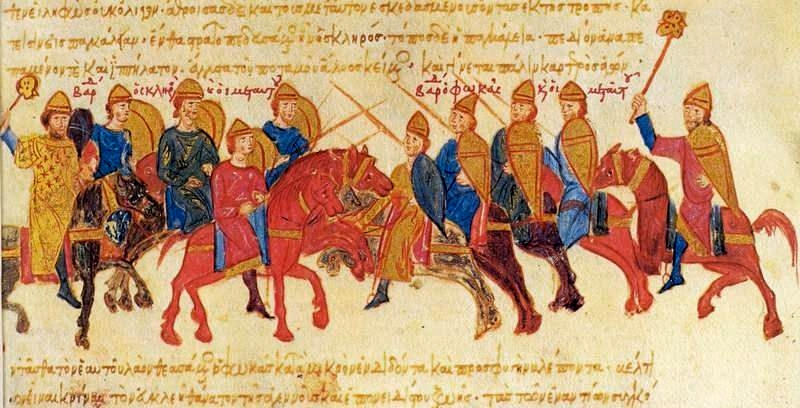
Clash between the armies of Skleros and Phokas, miniature from the Madrid Skylitzes.

In 978 Bardas was delivered from his prison cell by the eunuch Basil Lekapenos, Basil II's uncle and de facto regent. He was dispatched in disguise to his native Cappadocia to stir up the local aristocracy against Skleros, who had revolted against imperial authorities and advanced to the Hellespont. Despite several initial setbacks, and with the assistance of a Georgian army led by John Tornikios, Phokas eventually suppressed the revolt, gaining victory in single combat with Skleros. For his vital services to the crown, he was rewarded with a coveted office of Domestic of the Scholae and at once led the Byzantine armies to reconquer Aleppo from the Saracens. Later, to quote Psellos, "he was given the privilege of a triumph and took his place among the personal friends of his sovereign."

== Second rebellion ==
While Constantine VIII was easily swayed by his advisers, his brother Basil II was apparently irked by their supremacy. Basil's energy showed that he was determined to take the administration into his own hands and personally control the army. His growing independence alarmed both Basil Lekapenos and Phokas. In 987 they entered into secret negotiations with their former enemy, Skleros, on the understanding that the empire would be partitioned if they succeeded in their revolt against the emperors.

In a campaign that curiously mimicked Skleros' revolt a decade earlier, Phokas proclaimed himself emperor and overran most of Asia Minor. "It was no longer in imagination, but in very truth, that he put on the imperial robes, with the emperor's crown and the royal insignia of purple", says Psellos.

After relegating his colleague Skleros to a prison, Phokas proceeded to lay siege to Abydos, thus threatening to blockade the Dardanelles. At this point Basil II obtained timely aid, in the form of Varangian mercenaries, from his brother-in-law Vladimir, the Rus prince of Kiev, and marched to Abydos.

The two armies were facing each other, when Phokas galloped forward, seeking personal combat with the Emperor who was riding in front of the lines. Just as he prepared to charge at Basil, however, Phokas suffered a seizure, fell from his horse, and was found to be dead (April 13, 989). His head was cut off and brought to Basil. This ended the rebellion.

== Family ==
By his marriage to a cousin, one Adralestina, Bardas left two sons, Leo and Nikephoros (died 1022). His grandson and namesake, Bardas Phokas, was blinded by imperial authorities in 1025. It is believed that the Cretan family of the Phokades descends from him.
