= Epitaph on the tomb of Basil II =

Byzantine Greek inscription

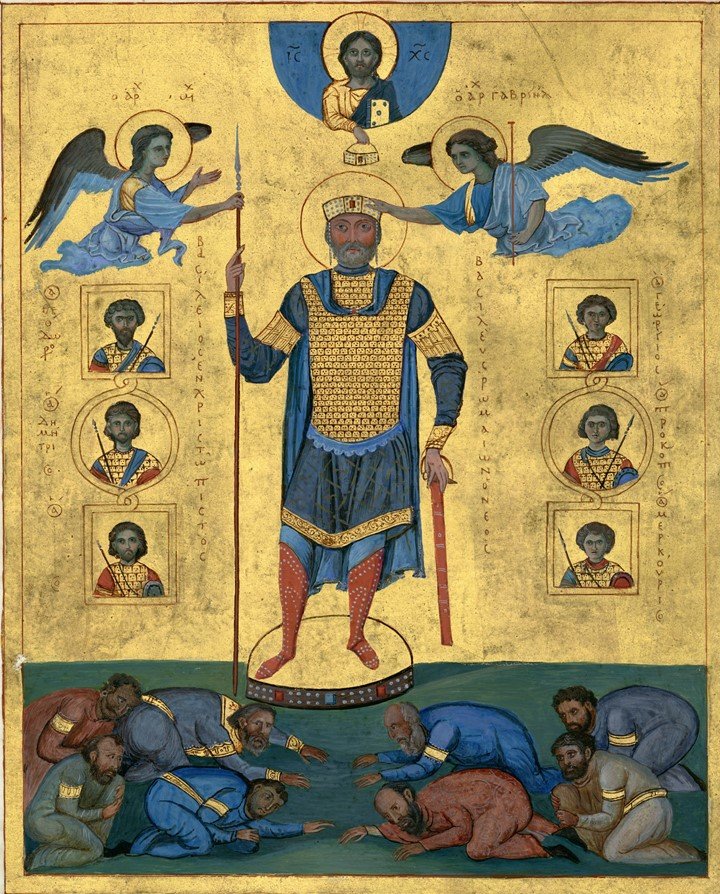
Emperor Basil II receiving the submission of his vanquished foes.

The long reign of the Byzantine Emperor Basil II (976–1025) saw continuous warfare in both East (against the Arabs) and West (against the Bulgarians). A true soldier-emperor, Basil led most of these campaigns himself, something reflected in his epitaph. His complete subjugation of the Bulgarian state earned him the epithet "Bulgar-Slayer" by later generations. Initially, he was to be buried in the last sarcophagus available in the rotunda of Constantine I in the Church of the Holy Apostles in Constantinople. However, Basil later asked his brother and successor Constantine VIII to be buried in the Church of St. John the Theologian (i.e. the Evangelist), at the Hebdomon, a suburb outside the walls of Constantinople which traditionally served as a major army encampment and parade ground. The epitaph on this tomb celebrated Basil's campaigns and victories. The text survives in a number of variants, and its authorship and date are unclear. It is attributed by a 14th-century manuscript to Michael Psellos.

== Text and translation ==
Original text

στίχοι ἐπιτάφιοι εἰς τὸν τάφον κυροῦ
Βασιλείου τοῦ Βουλγαροκτόνου καὶ βασιλέως.
ἄλλοι μὲν ἄλλῃ τῶν πάλαι βασιλέων
αὑτοῖς προαφώρισαν εἰς ταφὴν τόπους,
ἐγὼ δὲ Βασίλειος, πορφύρας γόνος,
ἵστημι τύμβον ἐν τόπῳ γῆς Ἑβδόμου
καὶ σαββατίζω τῶν ἀμετρήτων πόνων
οὓς ἐν μάχαις ἔστεργον, οὓς ἐκαρτέρουν·
οὐ γάρ τις εἶδεν ἠρεμοῦν ἐμὸν δόρυ,
ἀφ’ οὗ βασιλεὺς οὐρανῶν κέκληκέ με
αὐτοκράτορα γῆς, μέγαν βασιλέα·
ἀλλ’ ἀγρυπνῶν ἅπαντα τὸν ζωῆς χρόνον
Ῥώμης τὰ τέκνα τῆς Νέας ἐρυόμην
ὁτὲ στρατεύων ἀνδρικῶς πρὸς ἑσπέραν,
ὁτὲ πρὸς αὐτοὺς τοὺς ὅρους τοὺς τῆς ἕω,
ἱστῶν τρόπαια πανταχοῦ γῆς μυρία·
καὶ μαρτυροῦσι τοῦτο Πέρσαι καὶ Σκύθαι,
σὺν οἷς Ἀβασγός, Ἰσμαήλ, Ἄραψ, Ἴβηρ·
καὶ νῦν ὁρῶν, ἄνθρωπε, τόνδε τὸν τάφον
εὐχαῖς ἀμείβου τὰς ἐμὰς στρατηγίας.

English translation

Verses funereal on the tomb of lord (kyr)
Basil the Bulgar-slayer and emperor (basileus).
Other emperors of old,
other burial places for themselves ordained,
But I, Basil, born in the purple,
place my tomb on the site of Hebdomon
and I sabbatize from the endless toils
which I accepted in battles, and which I endured.
For nobody saw my spear at rest,
from when the King of Heavens called me
autokrator of the earth and great emperor.
But remaining vigilant through the whole span of my life
guarding the children of New Rome
when I marched bravely to the West (Hesperia),
and as far as the very frontiers of the East (Eos),
settling countless trophies all over the earth.
The Persians and Scythians (Bulgars) bear witness to this,
and along with them the Abasgian, Ishmael, the Arab, the Iberian.
And now, man, looking upon this tomb
reward my campaigns with prayers.
