= Aquae Saravenae =

Town of ancient Cappadocia

Coordinates: 39°08′45″N 34°09′29″E

Aquae Saravenae was a town of ancient Cappadocia, inhabited during Byzantine times. The Battle of Pankaleia was fought at or near the town.

Its site is located near Kırşehir, Asiatic Turkey.
