= World History Encyclopedia =

British non-profit organization and encyclopedic resource

- Founded: August 2009; 17 years ago (as Ancient History Encyclopedia)
- Founder: Jan van der Crabben
- Type: Nonprofit organization
- Location: Horsham, United Kingdom
- Services: E-learning, education
- Official languages: English
- Key people: Jan van der Crabben (founder and CEO); James Blake Wiener (co-founder); Joshua J. Mark (co-founder); Mark Cartwright (publishing director)
- Affiliations: UNESCO, University of Buenos Aires, OER Commons
- Employees: 4 (2018)
- Website: www.worldhistory.org

World History Encyclopedia (formerly Ancient History Encyclopedia) is a nonprofit educational company created in 2009 by Jan van der Crabben. The organization publishes and maintains articles, images, videos, podcasts, and interactive educational tools related to history. All users may contribute content to the site, although submissions are reviewed by an editorial team before publication. In 2021, the organization was renamed from the Ancient History Encyclopedia to World History Encyclopedia as the scope of the resource changed from ancient history to the world history from all time periods. Original articles are written in English and later translated into other languages, mainly French and Portuguese.

== Organization history ==
The Ancient History Encyclopedia was founded in 2009 by van der Crabben with the stated goal of improving history education worldwide by creating a freely accessible and reliable history source. The nonprofit organization is based in Godalming, United Kingdom and Montreal, Canada, although it has no office and its team is globally distributed.

The site had an emphasis on ancient history when it was founded, but it later shifted to cover the Medieval and Early Modern periods as well. In 2021, the organization renamed itself World History Encyclopedia to reflect this change. In November 2024, World History Encyclopedia became a publishing partner of the artificial intelligence search company Perplexity.ai, providing information to Perplexity while partaking their revenue sharing program.

== Reception ==
The website has received praise by educational organizations and has been recommended by the School Library Journal, the Internet Scout Research Group at the University of Wisconsin–Madison, MERLOT, and the European Commission's Open Education Europa initiative. In 2016, it won the .eu Web Award for education from the organization EURid.
