= Battle of Pankaleia =

Medieval battle

- Part of Rebellion of Bardas Skleros
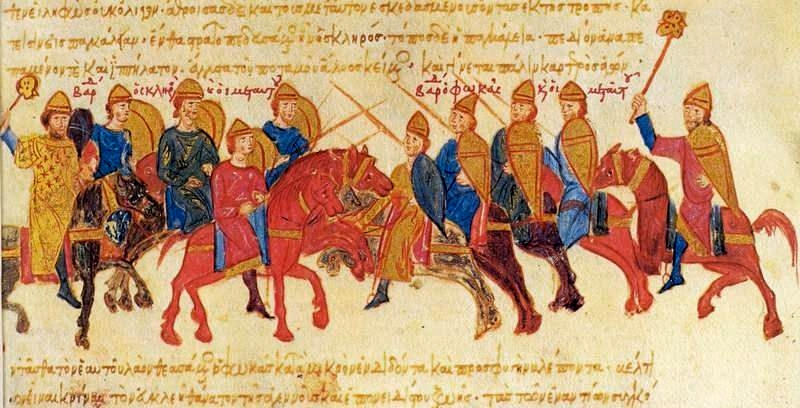
- Clash between the armies of Skleros and Phokas, miniature from the Madrid Skylitzes
| Date | 978 or 979 |
| Location | Plain of Pankaleia, northeast of Amorium |
| Result | Byzantine-Iberian victory |

Belligerents
| Byzantine Empire; Kingdom of the Iberians | Bardas Skleros |

Commanders and leaders
| Bardas Phokas the Younger; John Tornike | Bardas Skleros |

The Battle of Pankaleia was fought in 978 or 979 between the army loyal to the Byzantine emperor Basil II, commanded by Bardas Phokas the Younger, and the forces of the rebel general Bardas Skleros, which ultimately led to the defeat and exile of the latter. Sources are unclear in the succession and location of the events, so that while earlier scholars followed John Skylitzes in placing the Battle of Pankaleia in March 979 as the decisive victory for loyalist forces, today, following Leo the Deacon's account, it is placed in June 978 and regarded as a defeat for Phokas.

== Sources and reconstruction of events ==
Historical sources on the revolt of Bardas Skleros differ on the sequence and location of the battles that ended it, one of which was fought at the plain of Pankaleia (Παγκάλεια), northeast of Amorium. The history of John Skylitzes, written in the late 11th century, reports that Skleros won a first battle near Amorium, as well as a second at Basilika Therma (modern Sarıkaya), and that it was in a third engagement at Pankaleia that Phokas triumphed. According to Skylitzes, Phokas had been reinforced with 12,000 Georgian cavalry from Tao through his friendship with its ruler, David III, but his army again began to give way. Phokas then charged towards Skleros and engaged him in single combat, in which the rebel general was wounded and fled, sowing panic among his men.

The late 10th-century writer Leo the Deacon on the other hand writes that the loyalist army under Bardas Phokas first encountered the army of Skleros at Pankaleia and was defeated, but secured a decisive victory in a second battle at an unspecified location. Other authors provide some further details: Michael Psellos also reports the duel of the two generals at the decisive battle, while the early 11th-century Christian Arab historian Yahya of Antioch alludes to two battles, and gives the dates as 19 June 978 and 24 March 979 respectively. What is undisputed is that after his defeat, Skleros fled to his Arab ally, the Hamdanid emir Abu Taghlib, and thence sought refuge in the Buyid court in Baghdad, where he remained for the next seven years.

Based on Georgian sources, P.M. Tarchnichvili suggested in 1964 that the victory of Phokas took place at a site called "Sarvenis" in Georgian, which he identified as Aquae Saravenae (modern Kırşehir), north of Caesarea, and that Skylitzes's third battle (who erroneously places Pankaleia near the river Halys, which corresponds to the site of Kırşehir) is a fictionalized mixture of the real first and second battles, a view shared also by John Forsyth in his 1977 critical edition of Yahya's chronicle in English. According to Catherine Holmes, Skylitzes' account, although doubtlessly embellished, probably relies on an actual source given its level of detail, but that in the end "adjudicating between these possibilities is all but impossible" and that the only certain thing is that the decisive final battle took place in March 979.

Earlier scholars, like George Finlay and George Ostrogorsky, generally accepted the account of John Skylitzes, with the decisive final battle between Skleros and Phokas at Pankaleia in March 979, sometimes labelled the "second" Battle of Pankaleia, depending on whether the first battle between the two generals near Amorium was also regarded as taking place at the same site. Modern scholars on the other hand have adopted a different reconstruction of events, with a first battle taking place at Pankaleia in June 978, a second battle some time at Basilika Therma in Charsianon later in autumn/winter, and with the third and decisive battle taking place at Sarvenis in March 979.

== Sources ==
- Brand, Charles M. (1991). "Pankaleia". In Kazhdan, Alexander (ed.). The Oxford Dictionary of Byzantium. Oxford and New York: Oxford University Press. p. 1571. ISBN 0-19-504652-8.
- Cheynet, Jean-Claude; Vannier, Jean-François (1986). Études Prosopographiques (in French). Paris: Publications de la Sorbonne. ISBN 978-2-85944-110-4.
- Finlay, George (1856). History of the Byzantine and Greek Empires, from DCCXVI to MCCCCLIII. Second Edition History of the Byzantine and Greek Empires, from DCCXVI to MCCCCLIII. Edinburgh: W. Blackwood and sons.
- Holmes, Catherine (2005). Basil II and the Governance of Empire (976–1025). New York: Oxford University Press. ISBN 0-19-927968-3.
- Ostrogorsky, Georg (1963). Geschichte des Byzantinischen Staates (in German) (3rd ed.). Munich: C. H. Beck'sche Verlagsbuchhandlung. OCLC 301446486.
- Rayfield, Donald (2013). Edge of Empires: A History of Georgia. Reaktion Books. ISBN 978-1780230702.
- Stouraitis, Ioannis. "Rebellion of Bardas Skleros, 976 - 979". Encyclopaedia of the Hellenic World, Asia Minor. Foundation of the Hellenic World. Archived from the original on 2 April 2015.
- Whittow, Mark (1996). The Making of Byzantium, 600–1025. Berkeley and Los Angeles, California: University of California Press. ISBN 978-0-520-20496-6.
- Wortley, John, ed. (2010). John Skylitzes: A Synopsis of Byzantine History, 811–1057. Cambridge: Cambridge University Press. ISBN 978-0-521-76705-7.
