= Empress Eudocia =

Empress Eudocia, Eudoxia or Eudokia can refer to:

- Aelia Eudoxia (died 404), wife of Roman emperor Arcadius
- Aelia Eudocia (c. 401–460), wife of Roman emperor Theodosius II
- Licinia Eudoxia (422–493), wife of Valentinian III and Petronius Maximus
- Fabia Eudokia (c. 580–612), wife of Heraclius
- Eudokia (wife of Justinian II) (fl. 7th century)
- Eudokia (wife of Constantine V) (fl. 8th century)
- Eudokia Dekapolitissa (fl. 9th century), wife of Michael III
- Eudokia Ingerina (c. 840–c. 890), wife of Basil I
- Eudokia Baïana (died 901), third wife of Leo VI
- Bertha-Eudokia of Provence (died 949), first wife of Romanos II, known for the Romanos Ivory
- Eudokia Makrembolitissa (fl. 11th century), wife of Constantine X and Romanos IV, empress regnant in 1067 and 1071
