= Macedonian art (Byzantine) =

Period of Byzantine art

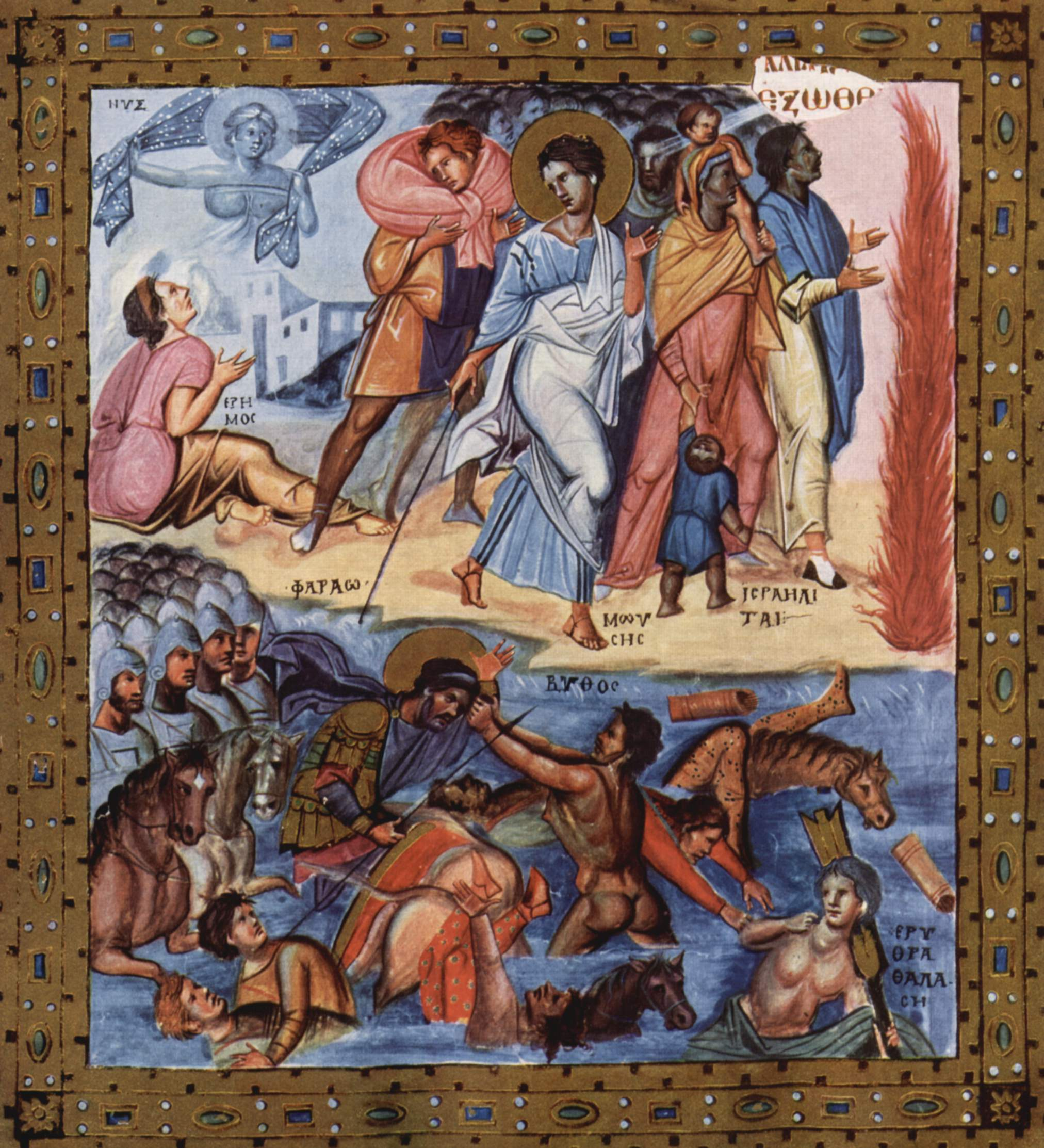
Scenes from the Paris Psalter

Macedonian art is the art of the Macedonian Renaissance in Byzantine art style. The period in which the art was produced, the Macedonian Renaissance, followed the end of the Byzantine iconoclasm era lasting from 867 to 1056, concluding with the fall of the Macedonian dynasty. The advent of the Macedonian Empire allowed for a new era of Byzantium revival where many aspects of the empire flourished including quality of life, art, architecture, technology, and military prowess, ultimately leading to the empires Medieval peak. This Macedonian era of the Byzantine empire was so prosperous it is considered the empire's Golden Age. Additionally the empire coincided with the Ottonian Renaissance in Western Europe.

"Macedonian" refers to the ruling dynasty of the period, rather than where the art was created. The court-quality pieces have, as with other periods, traditionally thought to have mostly been created in the capital, Constantinople, or made by artists based or trained there, although art historians have begun to question whether this easy assumption is entirely correct.

== Familial life and legacy ==
The Macedonian dynasty was the second longest-reigning in Byzantine history. However, its rule was frequently interrupted by individuals who secured their positions through marriage. This situation, often referred to as "dynastic grafting," allowed these foreigners to leverage the Macedonian dynasty's legitimacy and power to further their own family's ambitions. Despite its unpromising beginnings, the dynasty endured for centuries, with even usurpers of the throne compelled to maintain the appearance of Macedonian rule.

The founder of the dynasty, Basil I, born a peasant in Thrace or Macedonia around 830–836, Basil relocated to Constantinople, where he initially worked as a groom. His fortunes changed when Emperor Michael III took notice of him and brought him into the imperial household. Michael compelled Basil to divorce his wife and marry the emperor's mistress, effectively initiating him into power, a union that later sparked disputes over the paternity of Basil's sons. In 866, Basil solidified his authority by assassinating Michael's uncle, Bardas, elevating him to co-emperor. The following year, Basil continued the trail of Bloodshed, as he murdered Michael III, securing his position as sole emperor and successfully establishing himself as the first ruler of the dynasty.

== Mosaics, monasteries, and churches ==
Three significant monastic churches in Greece are frequently cited as "classic" examples of the Middle Byzantine mosaic program, those being the Katholikon of Hosios Loukas, situated in the foothills of Mount Helicon west of Thebes, Nea Moni, located on the island of Chios, and the Church of the Koimesis at Daphni, near Eleusis in Attica. Each of these structures provides insights into monastic and church practices, of the Macedonian period through mosaics, paintings, frescos and architecture.

The monastery of Hosios Loukas, despite little to no surviving records, is dated around 950 for the Church of the Theotokos and circa 1000 for the Katholikon, The vita of the monastery's founder, Saint Luke of Steiris, a miracle worker and healer, provides valuable insights into monastic practices, the monastery's establishment, and its expansions following his death in 953 and the Byzantine reconquest of Crete in 961. Additionally the Katholikon's mosaics and frescoes likely date to the late tenth or early eleventh century, following the monastery's second expansion. It remains one of the largest, best-preserved, and most extensively adorned Middle Byzantine monastic church.

Nea Moni ( Built: 1049–1055) is dated to the reign of Constantine IX, with the emperor's patronage linked to monks who successfully gained his support. As a result of land grants, tax exemptions, and other privileges granted by successive emperors, the monastery prospered during the Byzantine period. This imperial connection also suggests that the church and its mosaics may have been modeled after one of several churches in or near the Imperial Palace of Constantinople, Both Hosios Loukas and Nea Moni were constructed during the Macedonian dynasty (867–1056), a period continuously marked by cultural flourishing, advancements in learning, and significant church construction and restoration.

The Church of the Koimesis at Daphni, located along the ancient Sacred Way between Athens and Eleusis, is dated tentatively. It is attributed to around 1100, during the Comnenian dynasty, likely in the reign of Alexius I Komnenus (1081–1118). This makes it approximately half a century later than the other two churches. Despite this date, Daphni's architectural and decorative similarities to Hosios Loukas and Nea Moni underscore the enduring tradition of church building and mosaic decoration established after the end of Iconoclasm, continuing under the Macedonian and Comnenian dynasties.

== Artistic styles and movements under Macedonian era ==
New churches were again commissioned, and the Byzantine church mosaic style became standardized. The best preserved examples are at the Hosios Loukas Monastery in mainland Greece and the Nea Moni Katholikon in the island of Chios. The very freely painted frescos at Castelseprio in Italy are linked by many art historians to the art of Constantinople of the period also.

There was a revival of interest in classical Hellenistic styles and subjects, of which the Paris Psalter is an important testimony, and more sophisticated techniques were used to depict human figures. There was also a naturalistic style and more complex techniques from ancient Greek and Roman art mixed with Christian themes used in art.

The aftermath of the iconoclastic period freed Byzantine art from restrictive ecclesiastical influences and opened the door to innovative approaches. These included a revival of early Alexandrian traditions, the incorporation of ornate Arab-inspired motifs, and a shift toward historical and secular subjects. This era introduced originality marking a departure from the more rigid styles of prior centuries.

The artistic achievements of the Macedonian dynasty reflected grace, drawn from the Hellenistic fourth century, with the strength and beauty of earlier traditions. This blend of qualities infused Middle Byzantine art with a distinctive dignity, refinement, and balance. These characteristics became hallmarks of Byzantine design, aligning harmoniously with religious themes. Armenian elements, including architects and artistic techniques, were undoubtedly present—such as the restoration of St. Sophia by an Armenian architect—this influence did not overshadow Byzantine originality and themes.

Constantinople served as the epicenter of this artistic renaissance, but remarkable contributions emerged from the provinces. Key examples include the Church of Skripu in Boeotia (874), the monastic churches of Mount Athos, St. Luke of Stiris in Phocis, and the Nea Moni on Chios. The rock-cut churches of Cappadocia, adorned with vibrant frescoes from the 9th to 11th centuries, further exemplify the diversity and reach of Macedonian artistry.

The impact of Macedonian art extended well beyond Byzantine borders. Frescoes in Rome's Santa Maria Antiqua and the construction of St. Sophia of Kiev in 1037 reveal the dynasty's influence across regions. The Macedonian period, peaking between 867 and 1025, represents a pinnacle of Byzantine artistic vitality and creativity. However, the subsequent Comnenian period brought challenges, as political and social turmoil ushered in a more rigid and less dynamic artistic expression.

== Sculpture ==
Although monumental sculpture is extremely rare in Byzantine art, the Macedonian period saw the unprecedented flourishing of the art of ivory sculpture. Many ornate ivory triptychs and diptychs survive, with the central panel often representing either deesis (as in the Harbaville Triptych) or the Theotokos (as in a triptych at Luton Hoo, dating from the reign of Nicephorus Phocas). On the other hand, ivory caskets (notably the Veroli Casket from Victoria and Albert Museum) often feature secular motifs true to the Hellenistic tradition, thus testifying to an undercurrent of classical taste in Byzantine art.

There are few important surviving buildings from the period. It is presumed that Basil I's votive church of the Theotokos of the Pharos (no longer extant) served as a model for most cross-in-square sanctuaries of the period, including the monastery church of Hosios Loukas in Greece (ca. 1000), the Nea Moni of Chios (a pet project of Constantine IX), and the Daphni Monastery near Athens (ca. 1050).

== Gallery ==
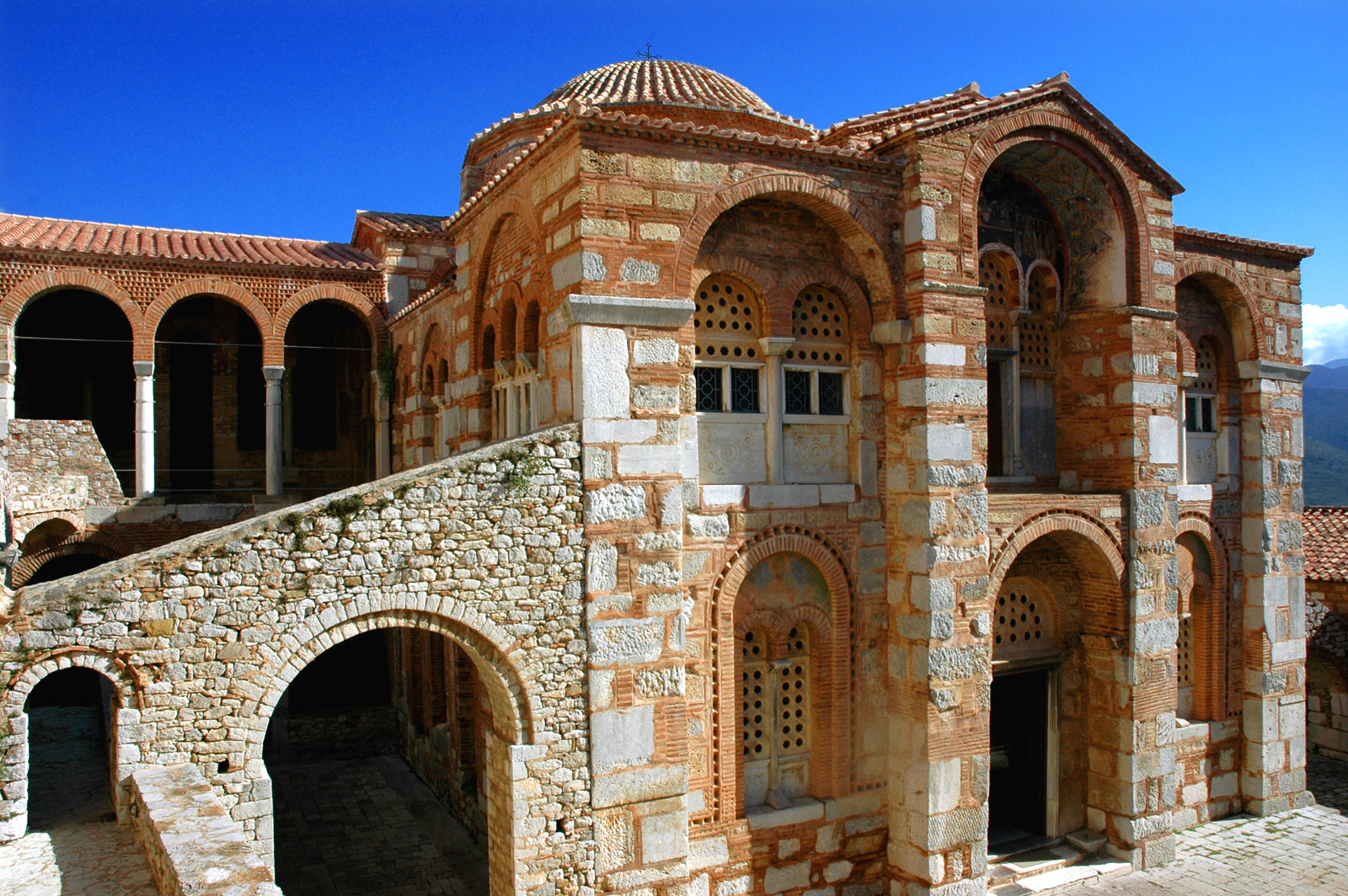
The 11th-century monastery of Hosios Loukas, representative of the Macedonian Renaissance

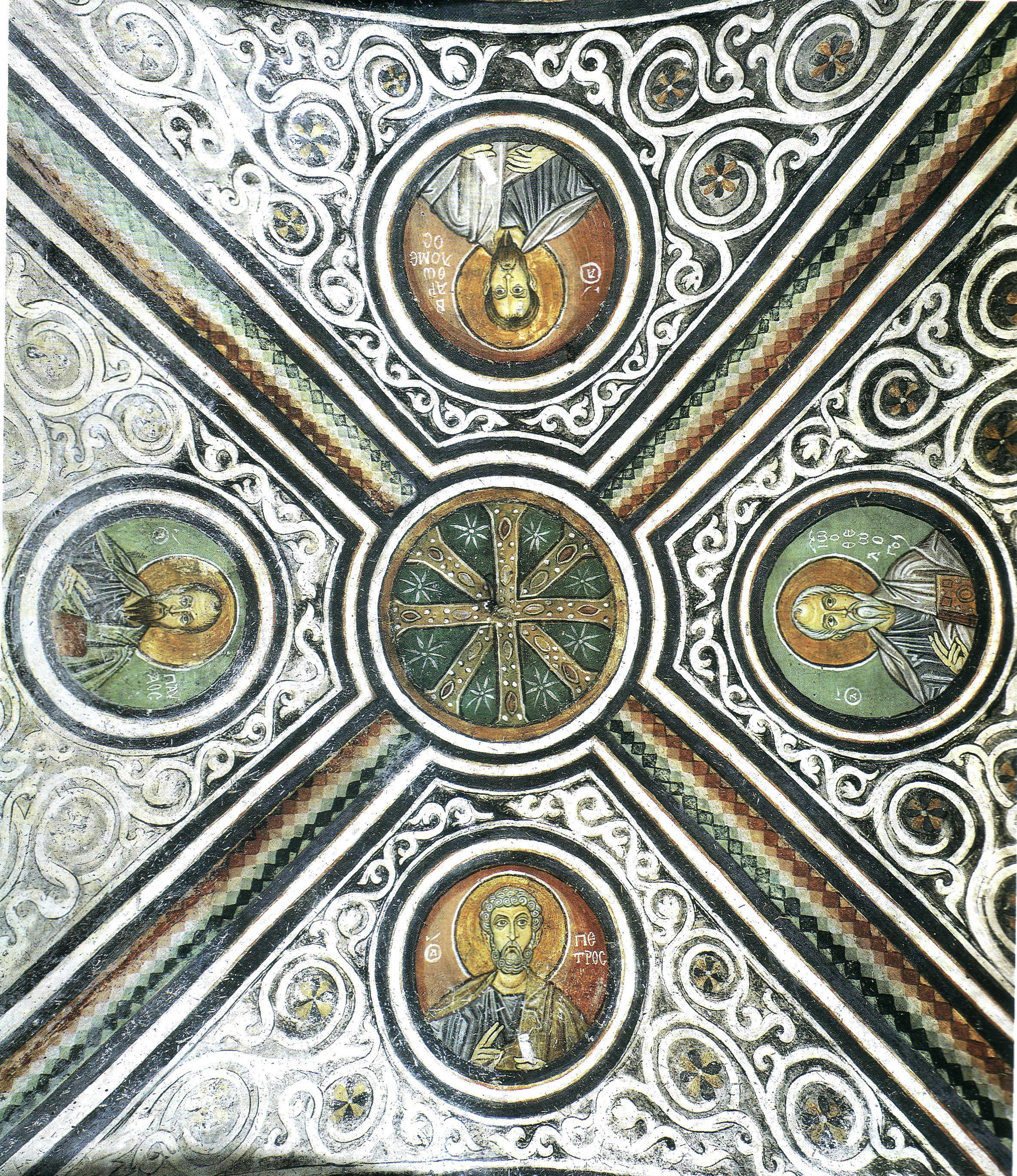
Frescoes of Hosios Loukas

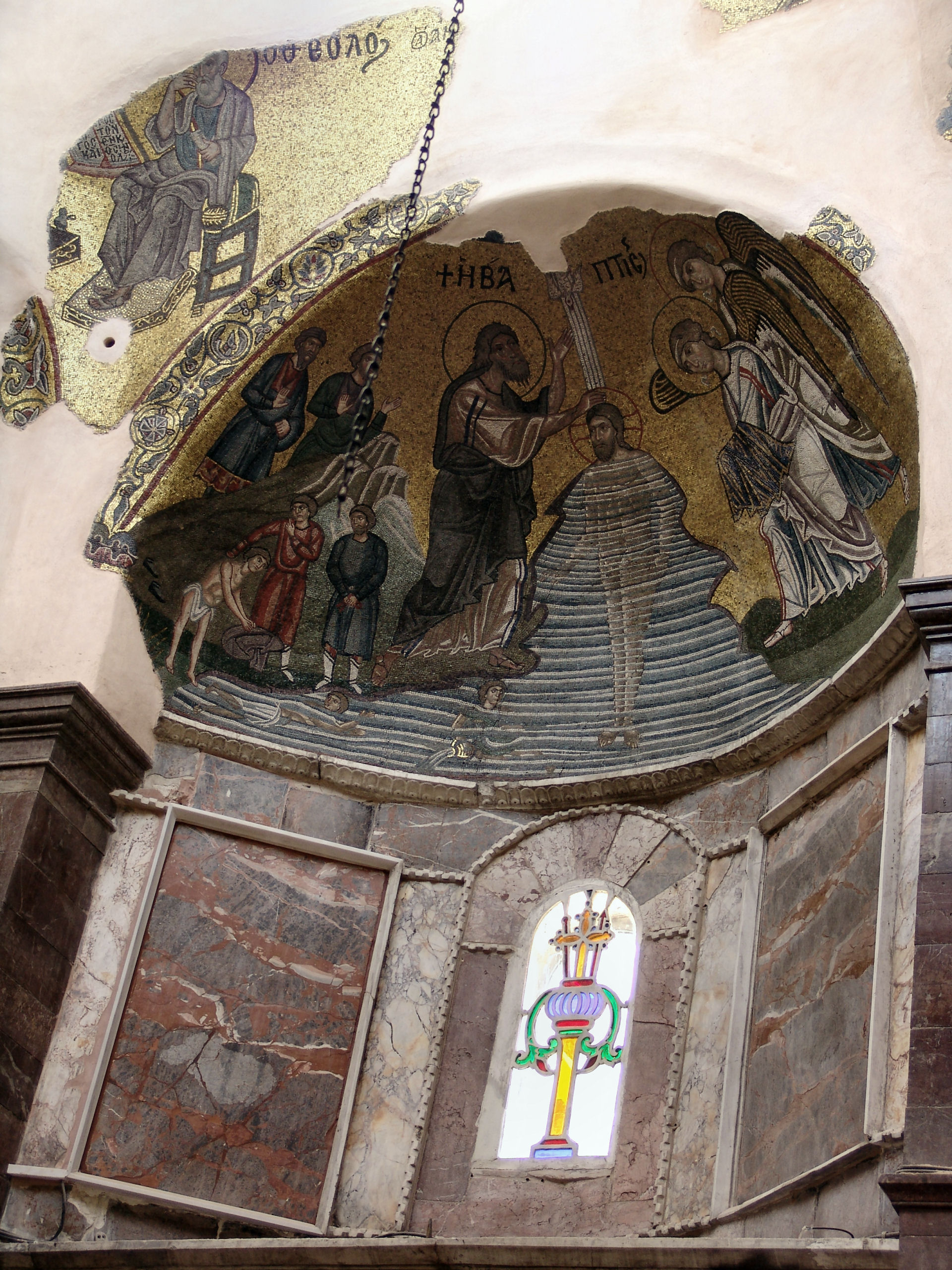
Mosaics of Nea Moni of Chios

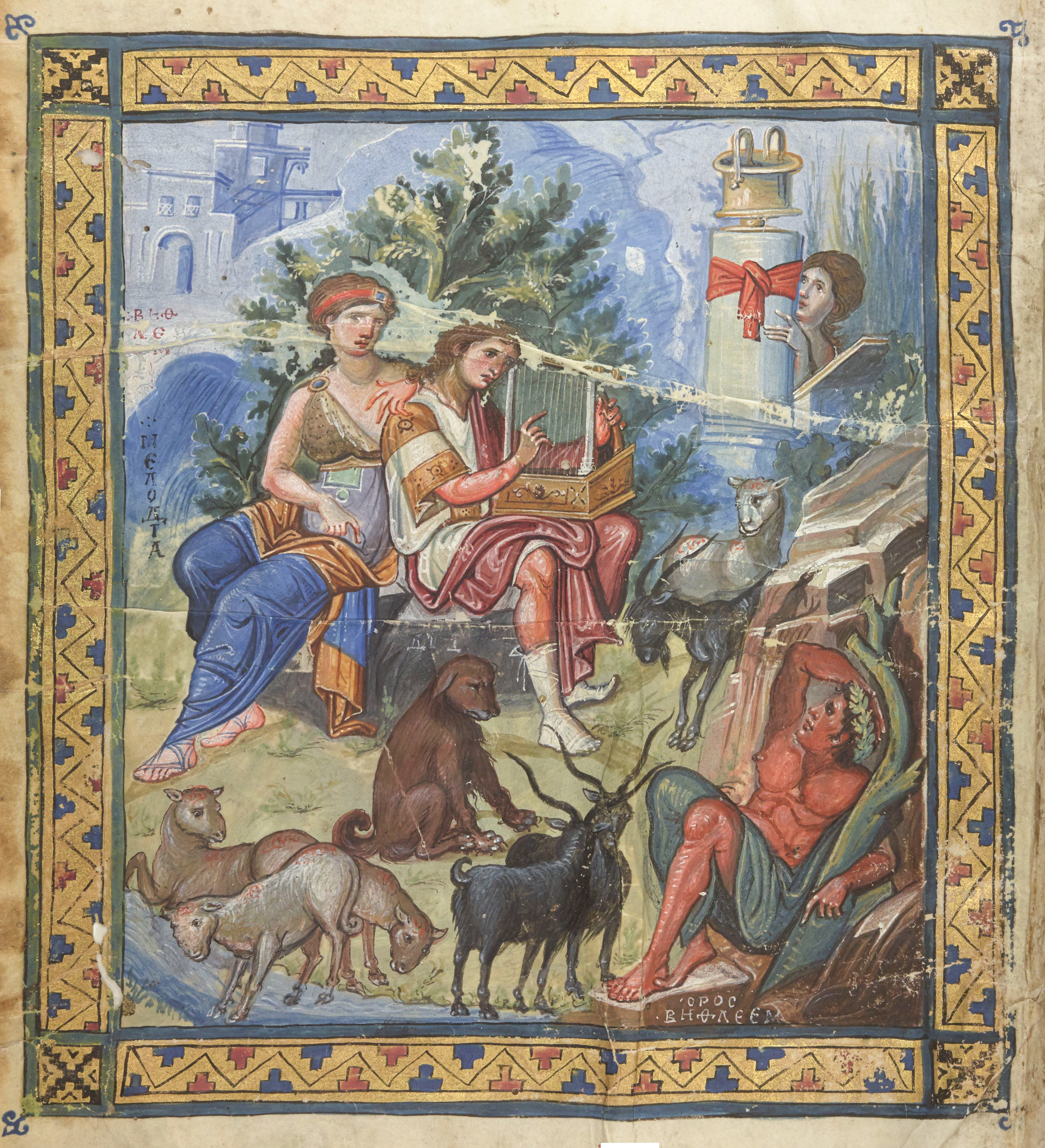
"David playing the harp", from the Paris Psalter

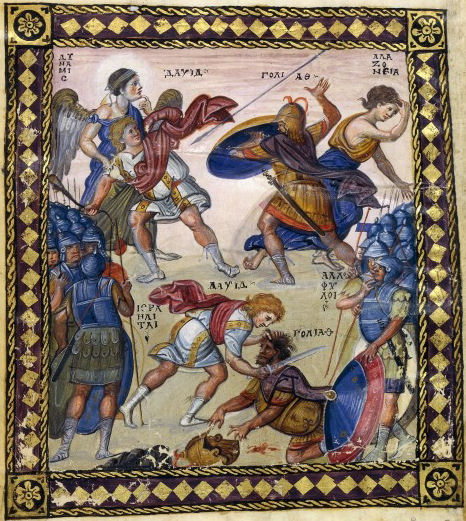
"David and Goliath", from the Paris Psalter

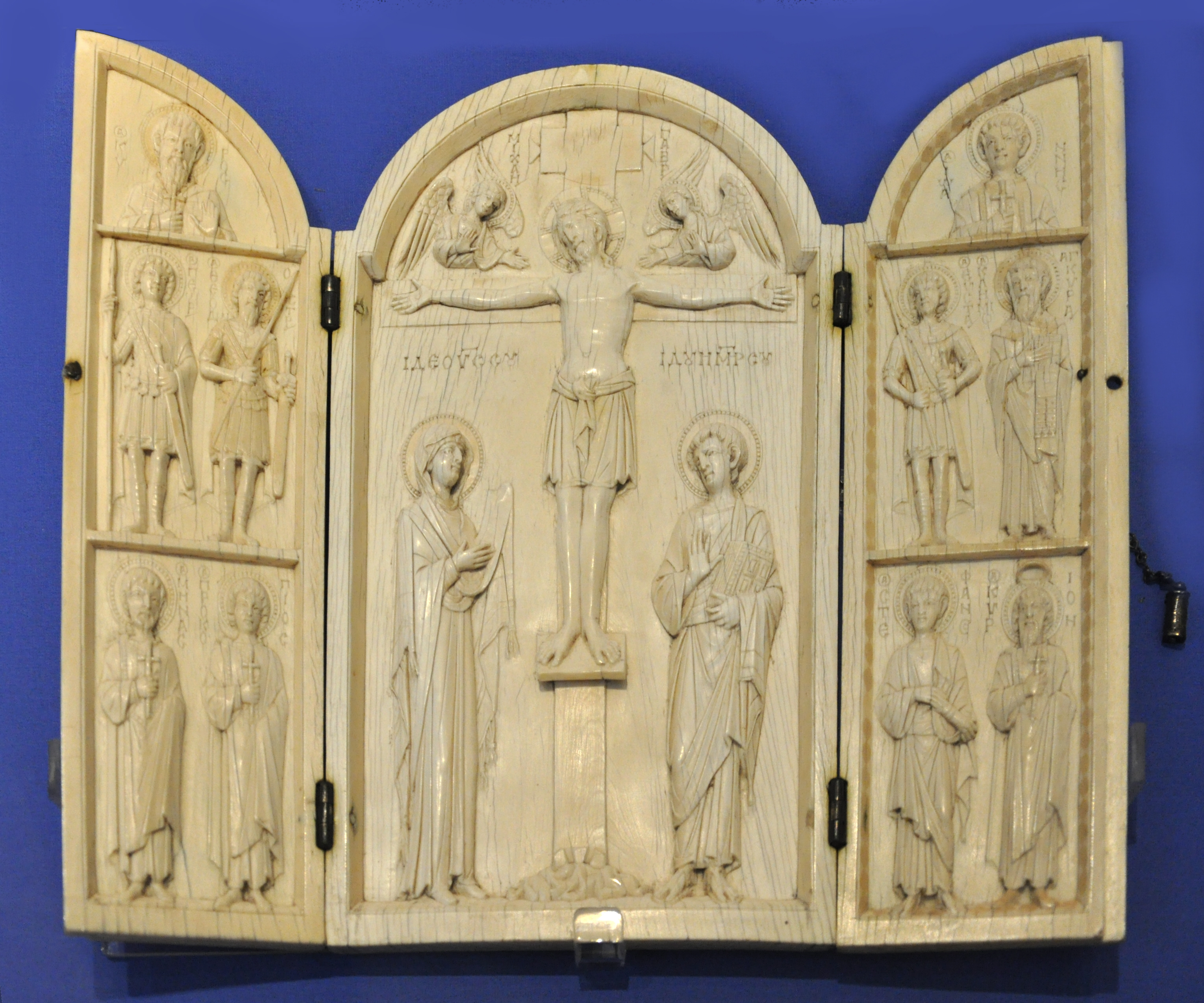
Borradaile Triptych

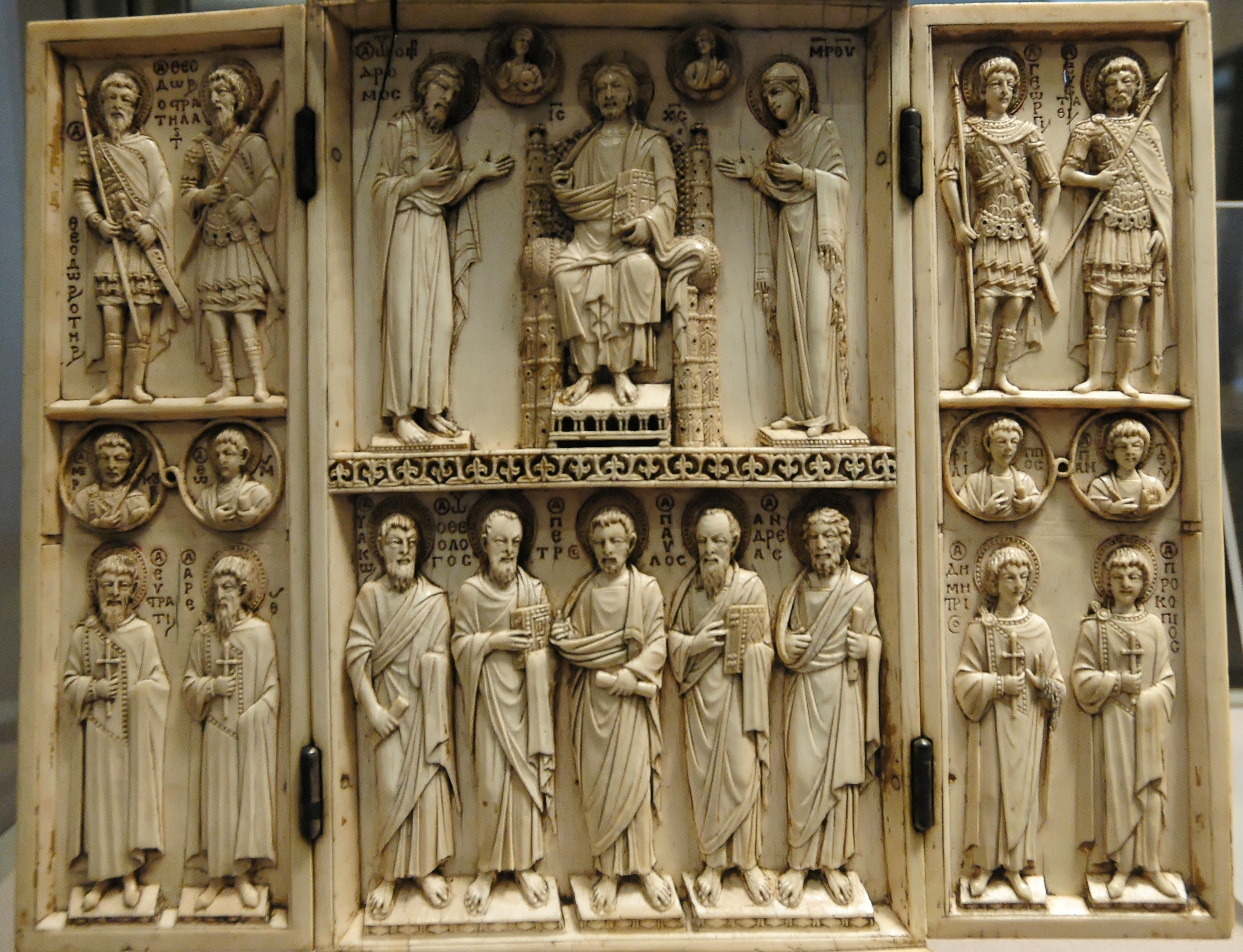
View of the Harbaville Triptych

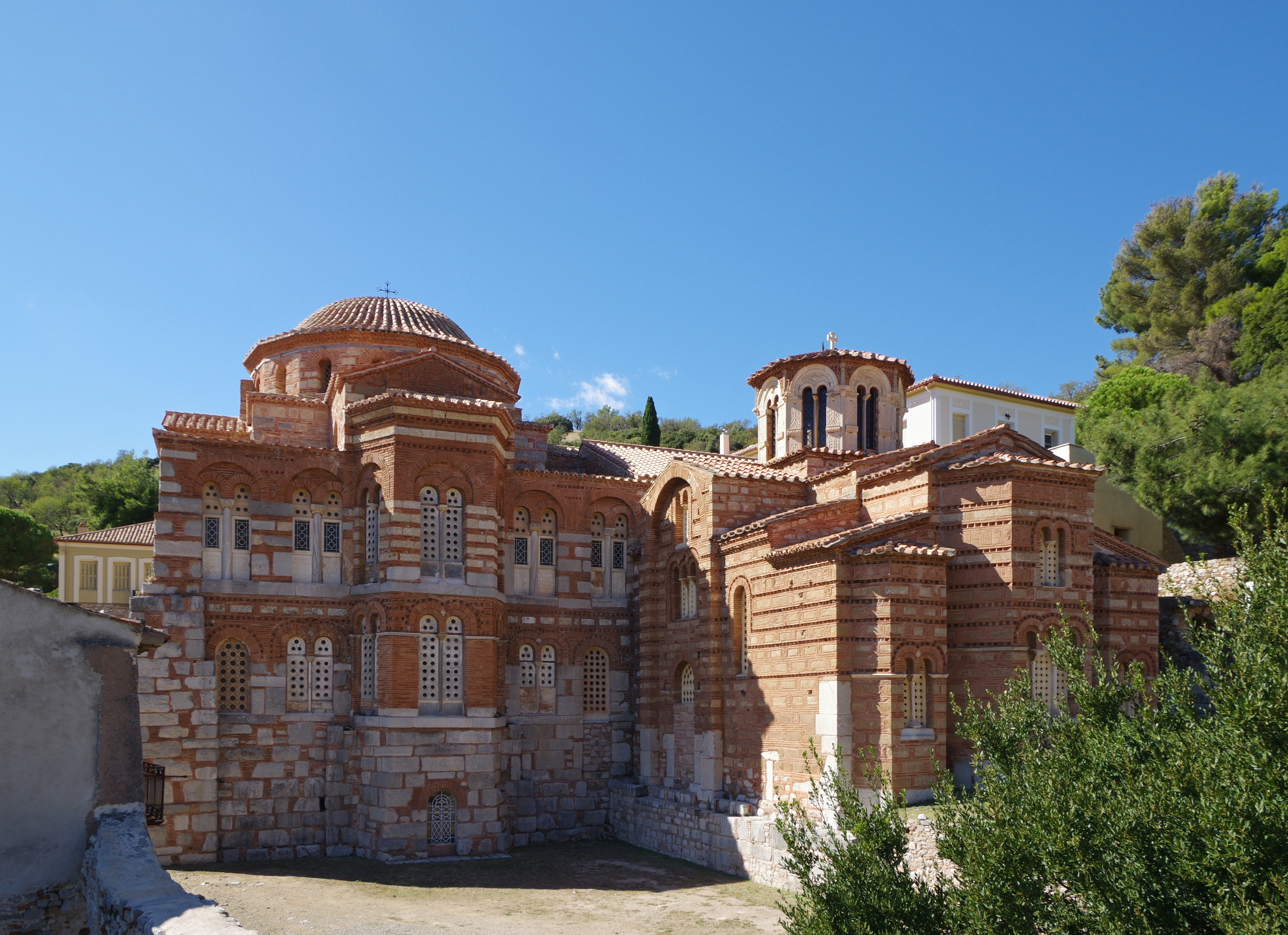
Exterior Image of the Hosios Loukas, ca. 950, located in the foothills of Mount Helicon

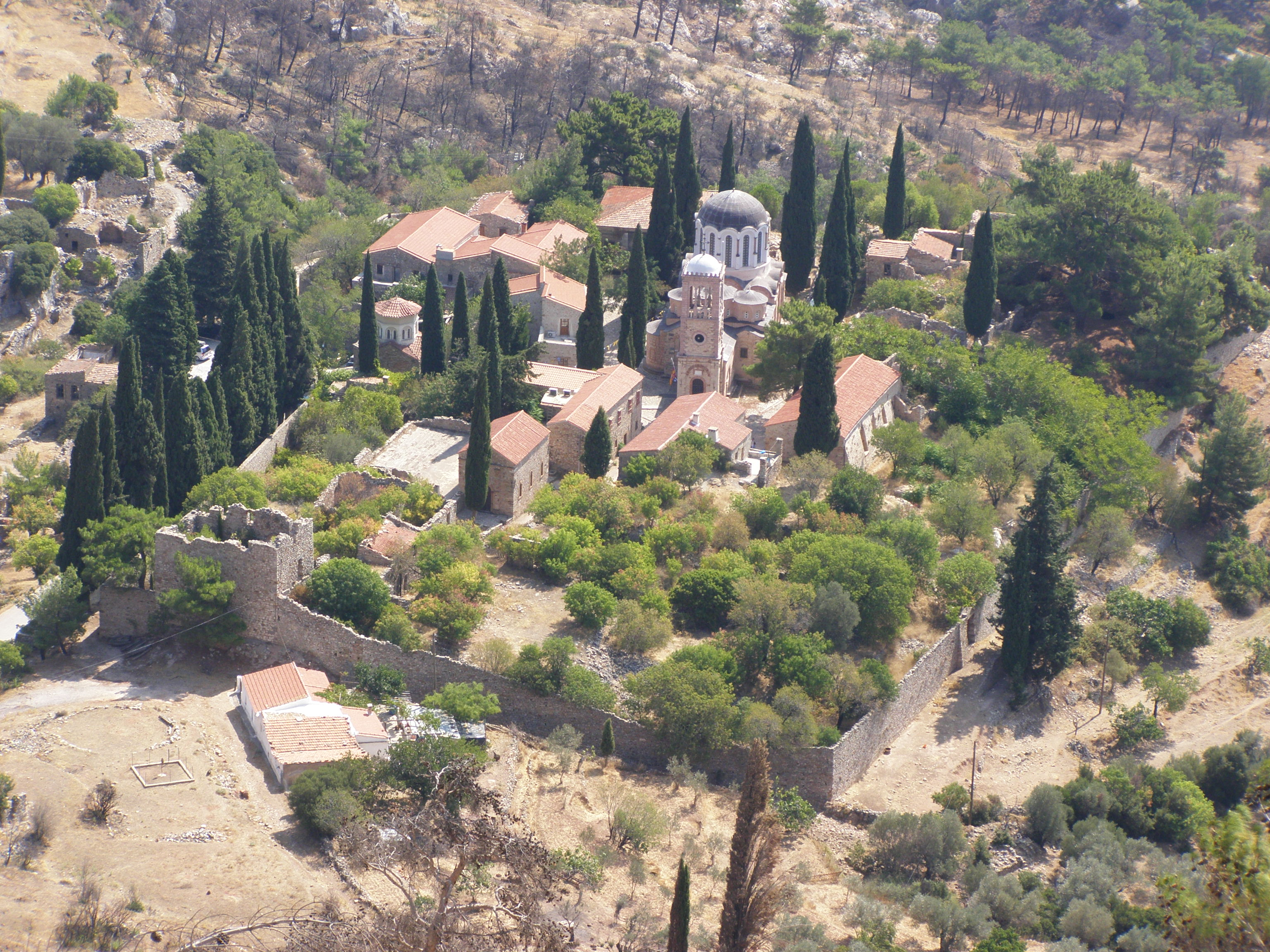
Exterior Image of the Nea Moni, (1045–1054)

== See also ==
- Joshua Roll
- Gunthertuch
