= Eiletarion =

Historical scroll used for liturgy

An Eiletarion (Greek: ειλητάριο, lit. "scroll") is a vertical liturgical scroll used in the Byzantine Empire that was used to read imperial donations or liturgical celebrations. It is featured in many mosaics and paintings during the Komnenos period, including within the monastery of Nea Moni in Chios and the Hagia Sophia in Istanbul. Although it has been mostly phased out in favor of the codex, it is still used today in some monasteries on Mount Athos.

== Sources ==
- Papazotos, Thanasis (1991). The Identification of the Church of "Profitis Elias" in Thessaloniki. Dumbarton Oaks Papers.
