= Harbaville Triptych =

Byzantine ivory triptych

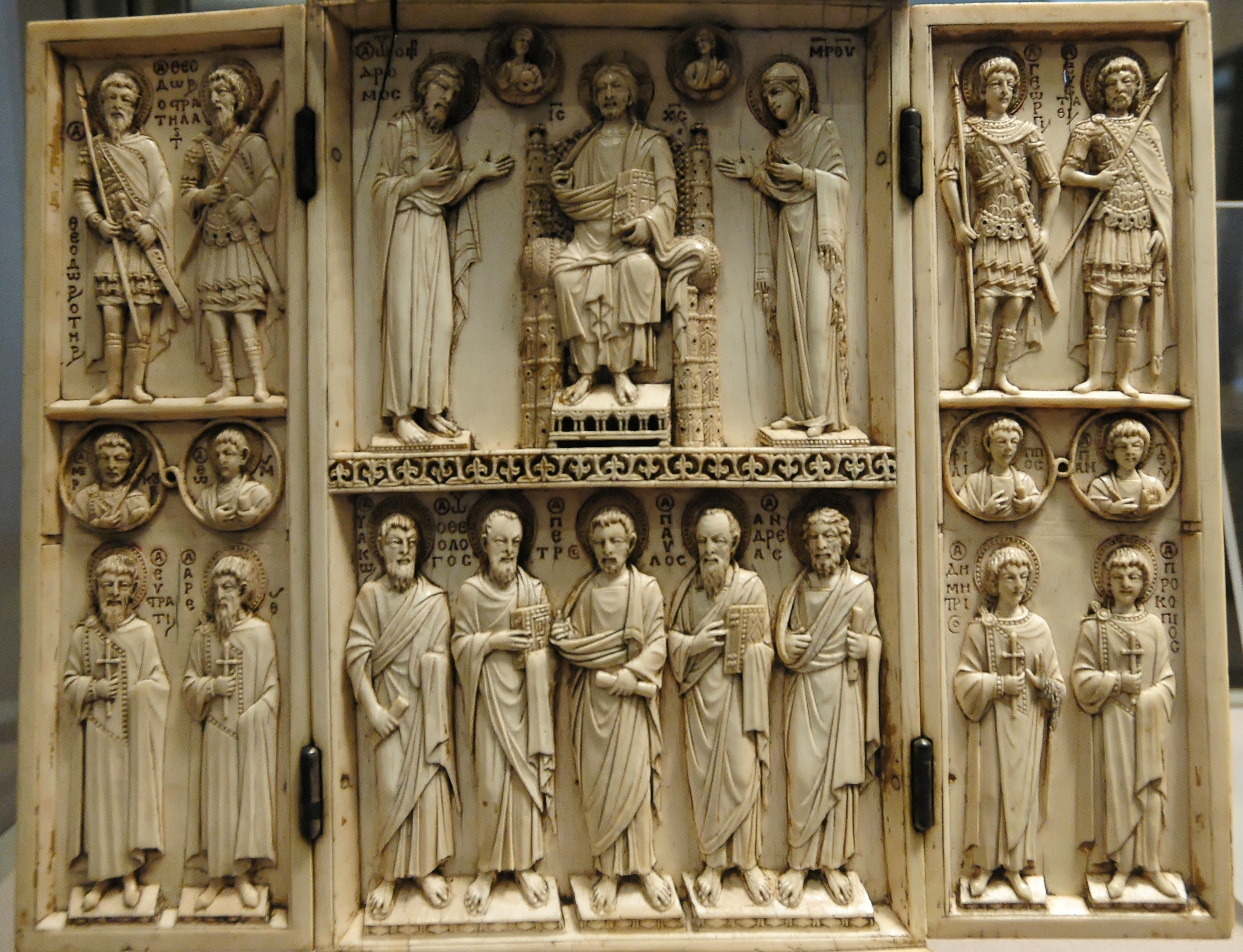
Recto, full view. 28 x 24 cm.

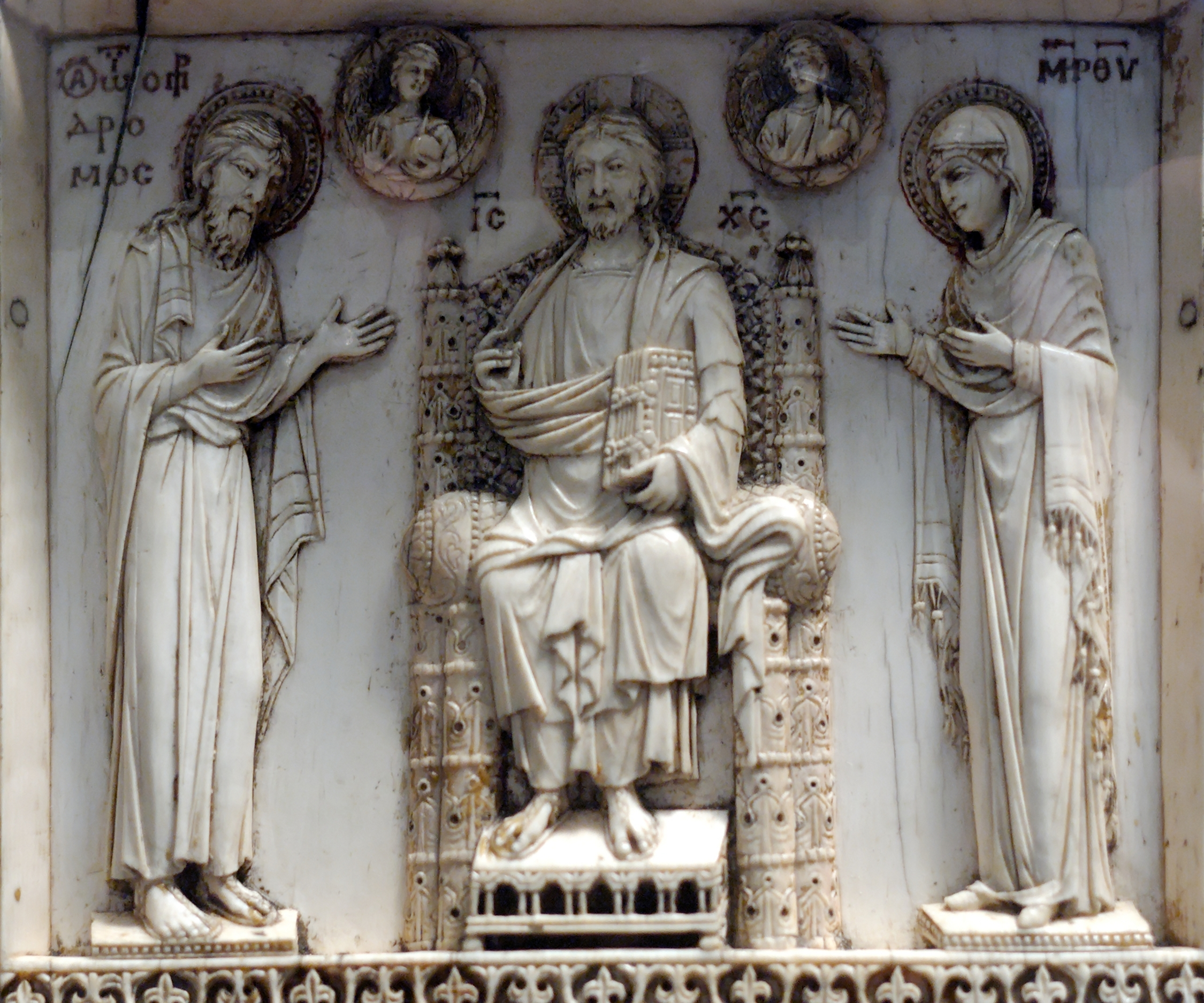
Middle leaf, top panel: Deesis, Christ, Mary and John the Baptist

The Harbaville Triptych (Greek: Τρίπτυχο Αρμπαβίλ) is a Byzantine ivory triptych of the middle of the 10th century with a Deesis and other saints, now in the Louvre. Traces of colouring can still be seen on some figures. It is regarded as the finest, and best-preserved, of the "Romanos group" of ivories from a workshop in Constantinople, probably closely connected with the Imperial Court.

The group takes its name from the Romanos and Eudokia ivory plaque in the Cabinet des Médailles of the Bibliothèque nationale de France, Paris showing Christ crowning an Emperor, named as Romanos, and his Empress. This is thought to be either Romanos II, crowned in 959, or possibly Romanos IV, crowned in 1068. Related works are in Rome, the Vatican, and Moscow, this last another coronation probably datable to 944.

Of this "Romanos group" the Harbaville Triptych is considered "by far the finest, for it shows an elegance and delicacy which are absent in the others. All are in the polished, elegant style typical of the Court school." Other groups of ivories have also been identified, presumably representing the output of different workshops, perhaps also employed by the Court, but generally of lower quality, or at least refinement. Since much greater numbers of ivories survive than panel paintings from the period, they are very important for the history of Macedonian art.

All sides of the triptych are fully carved, with more saints on the outsides of the side leaves, and an elaborate decorative scheme on the back of the central leaf.

The ivory's early history is unrecorded. It derives its name from its first known owner, the antiquarian Louis-François Harbaville (1791-1866), who inherited it from his in-laws, the Beugny de Pommeras family of Arras. It was purchased for the Louvre in 1891 from Harbaville's grandsons and heirs.

== Gallery ==
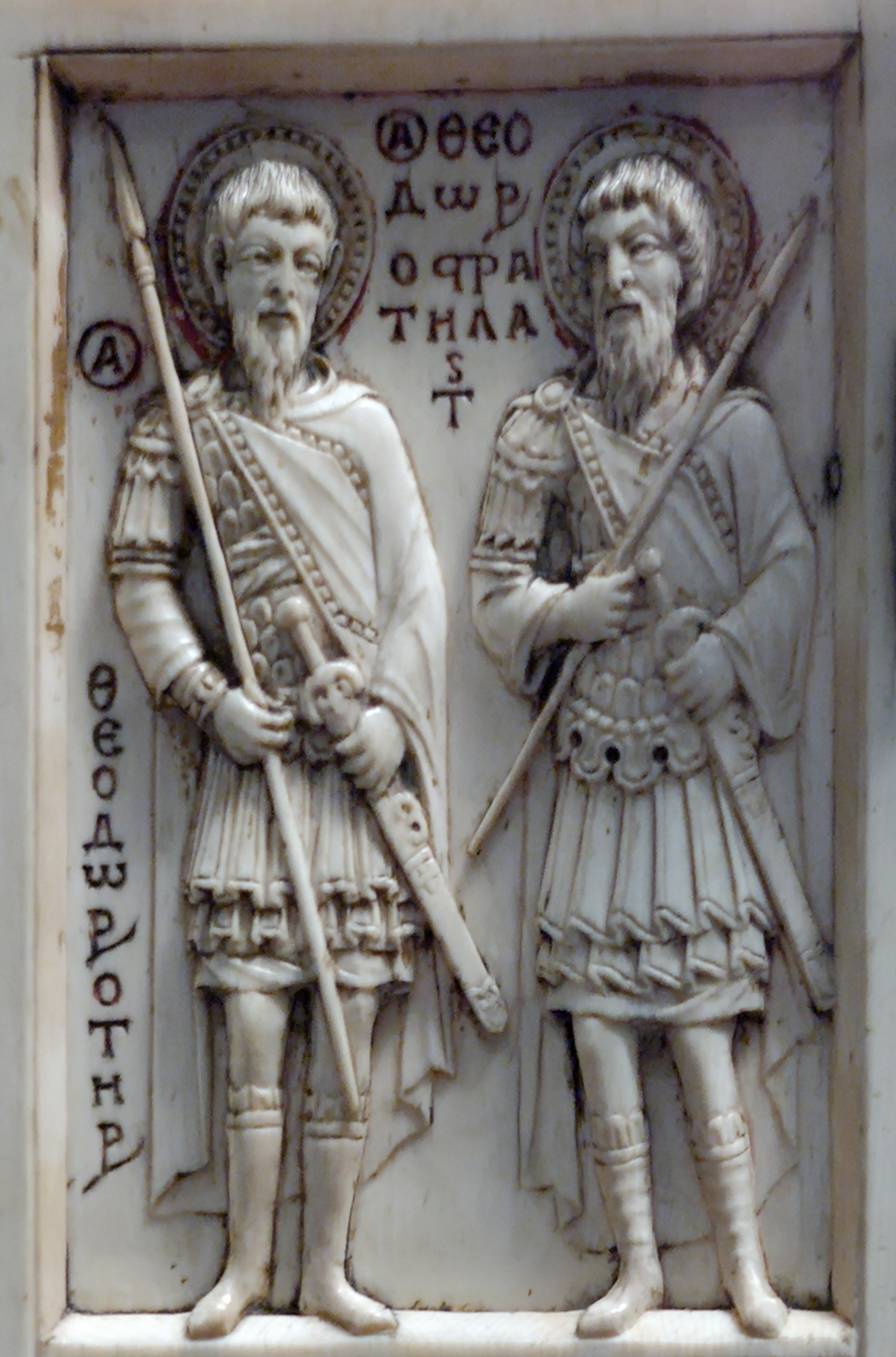
Left leaf, top panel: Saint Theodore the Recruit, Saint Theodore the General

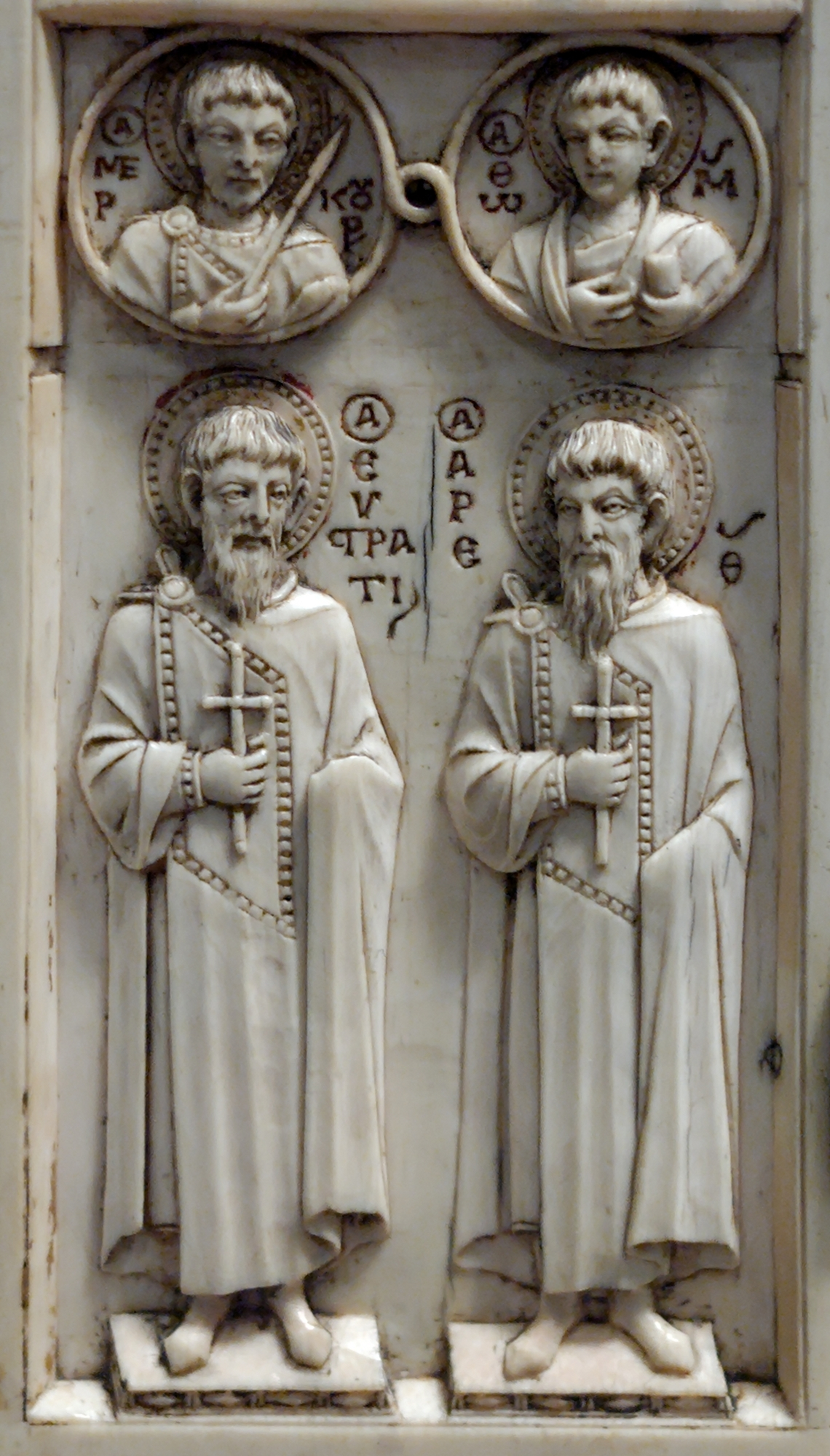
Left leaf, bottom panel: St. Eustratius and St. Arethas. In the roundels, Saint Mercurius and St Thomas the Apostle.

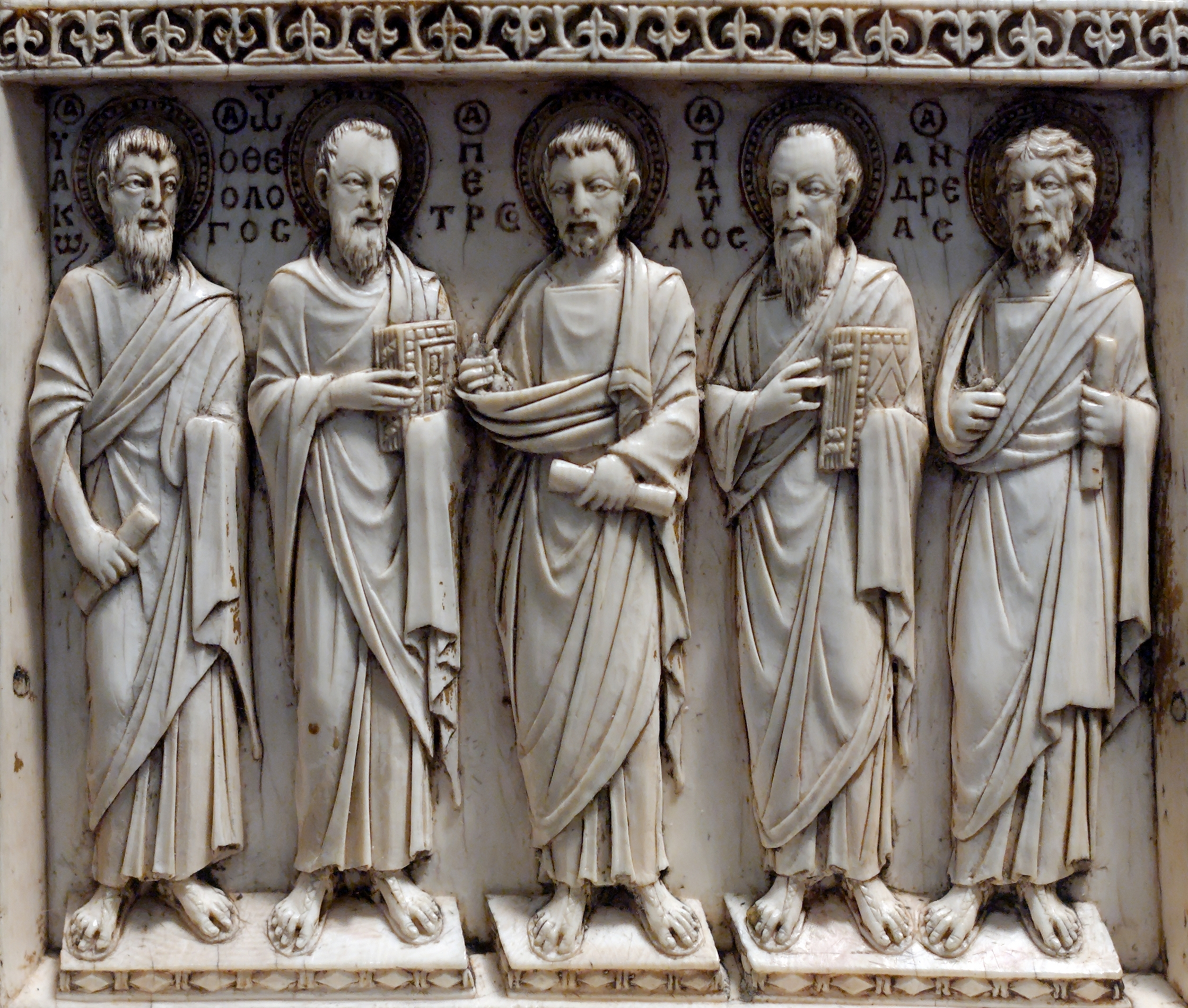
Middle leaf, bottom panel: Apostles James, John, Peter, Paul and Andrew

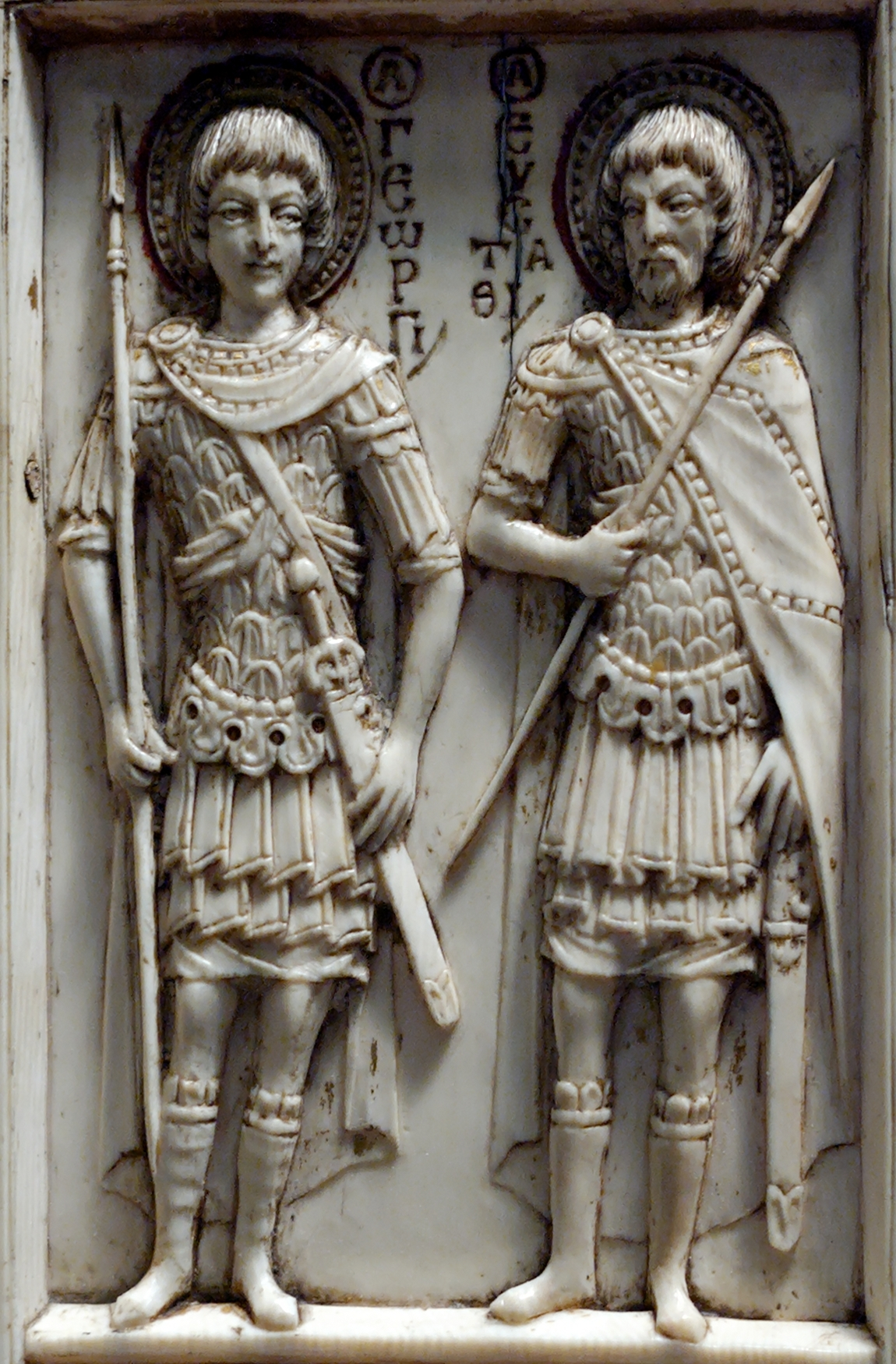
Right leaf, top panel: Saint George and Saint Eustace

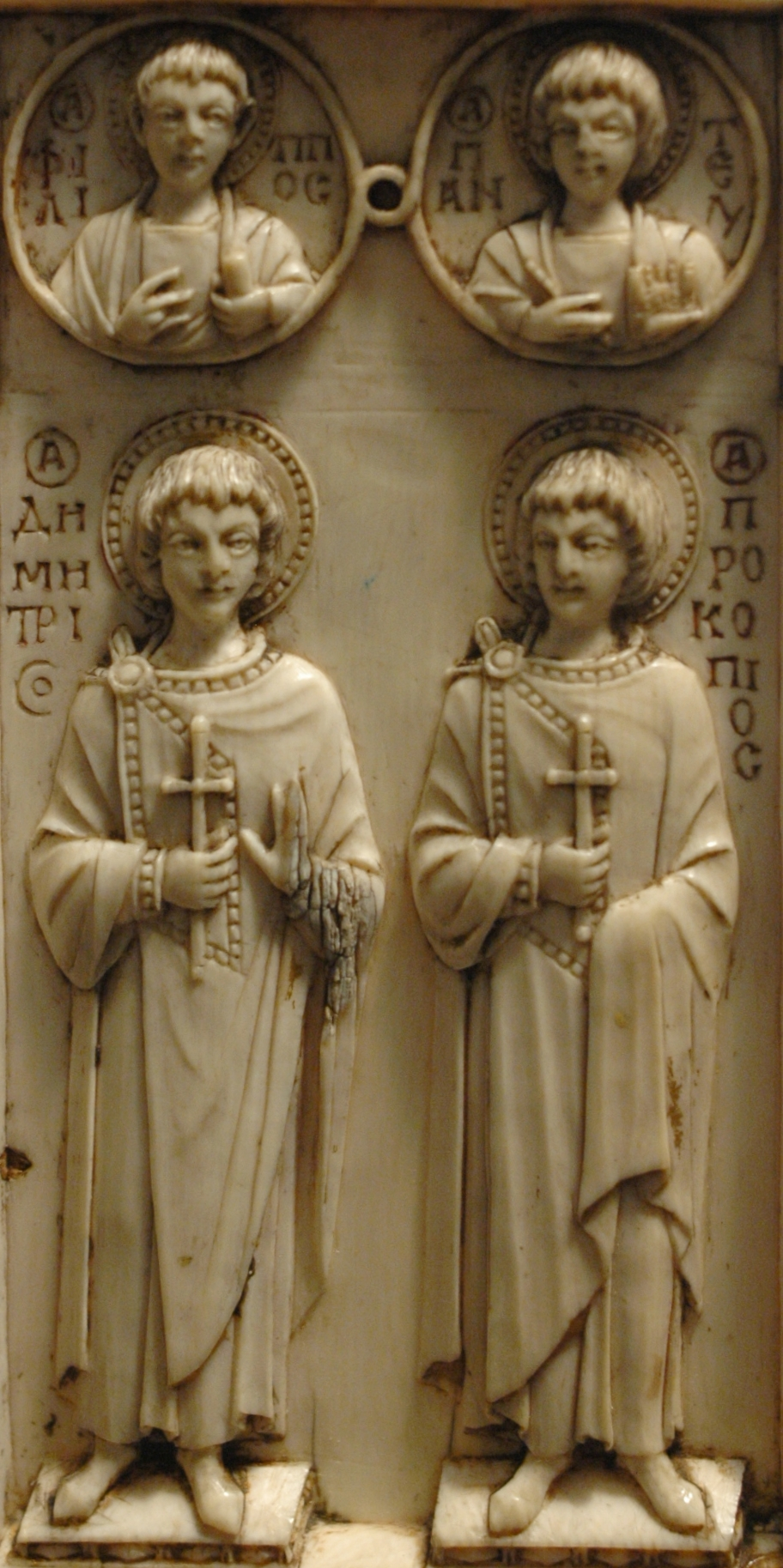
Right leaf, bottom panel: Saint Demetrius and Saint Procopius. In the roundels, St. Philip the Apostle and Saint Pantaleimon

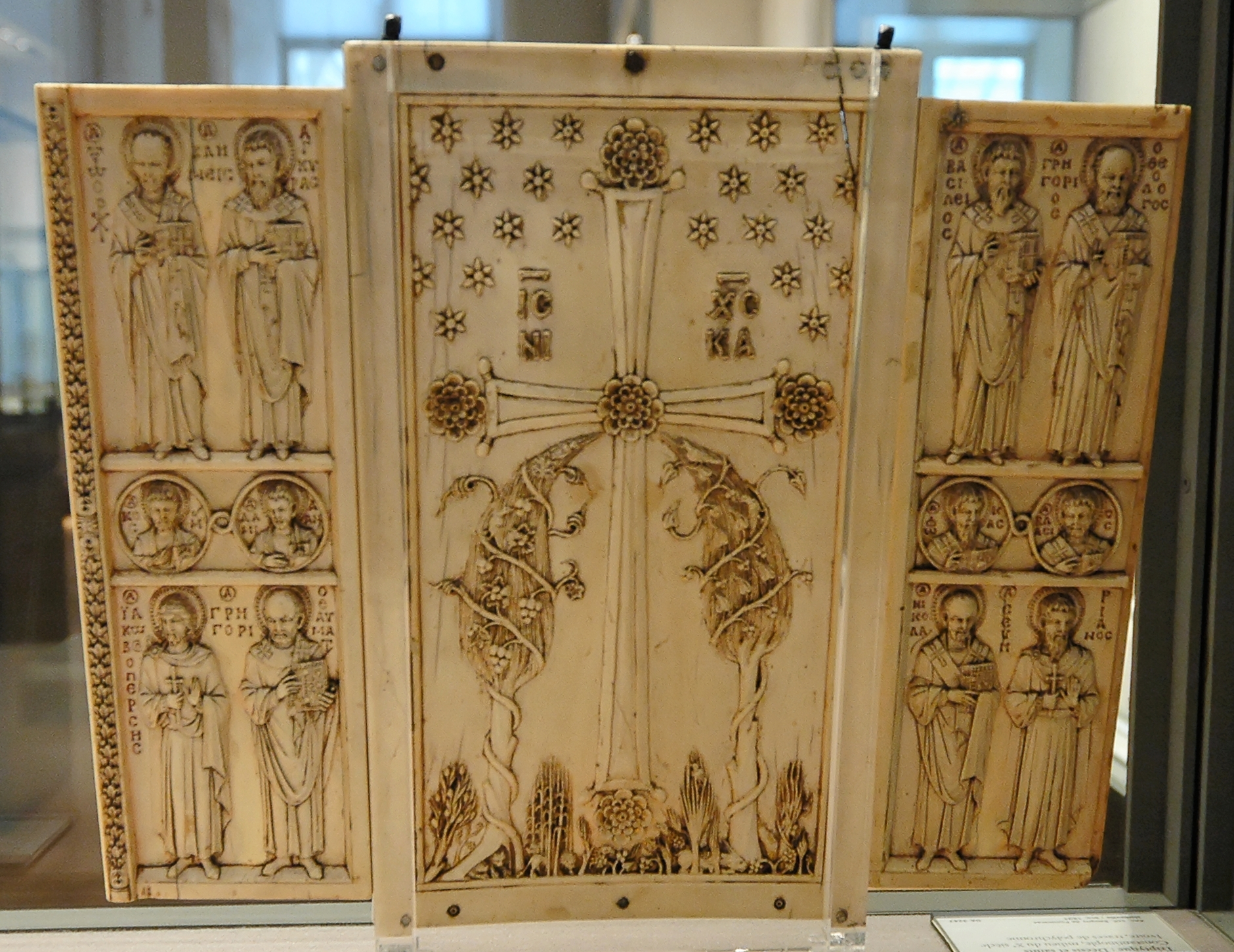
Verso, full view

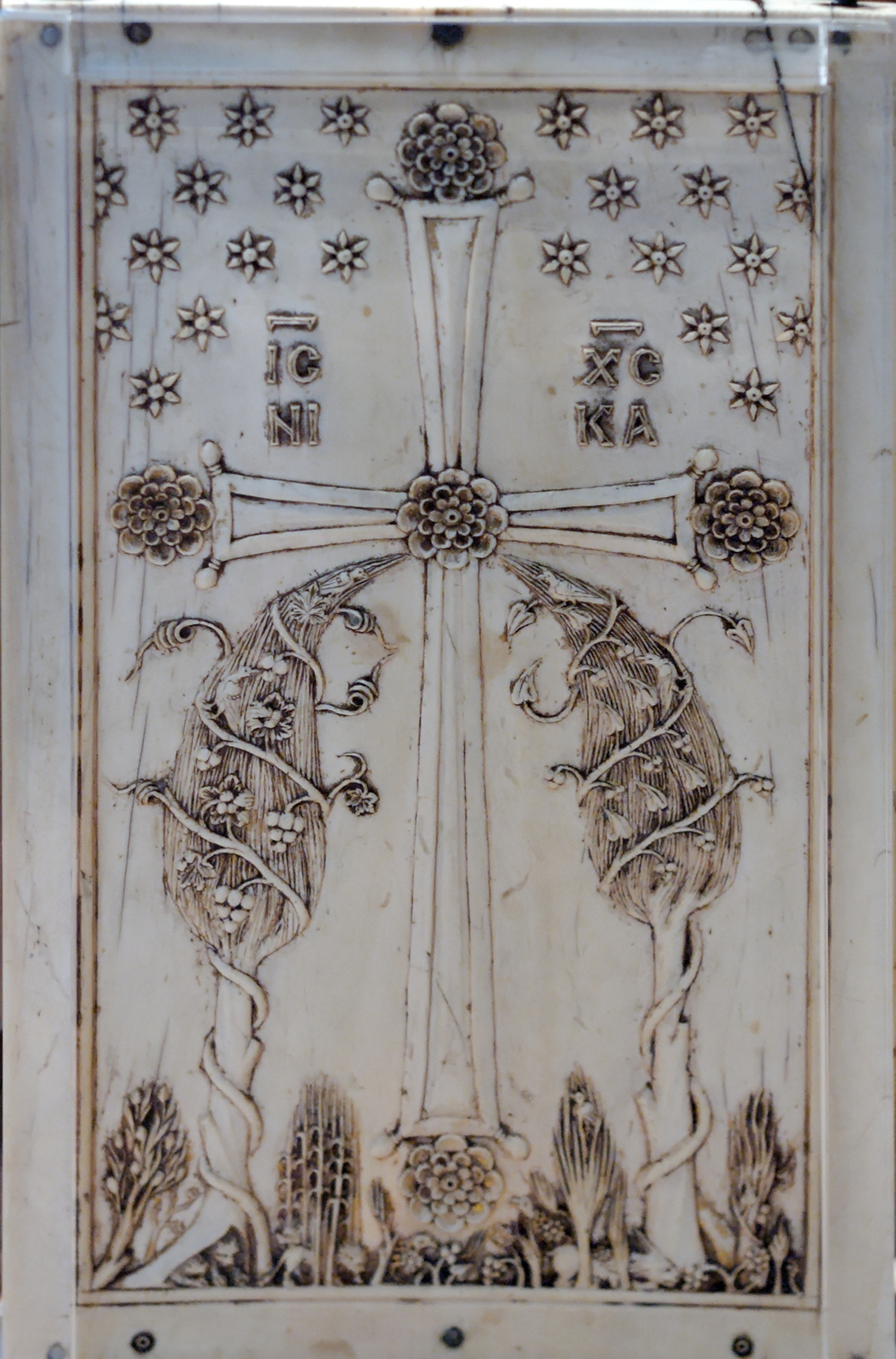
Verso of middle leaf: representing the triumphal cross in Paradise, with two trees of life and the inscription "Iesou Christos nika" ("Jesus Christ conquers")

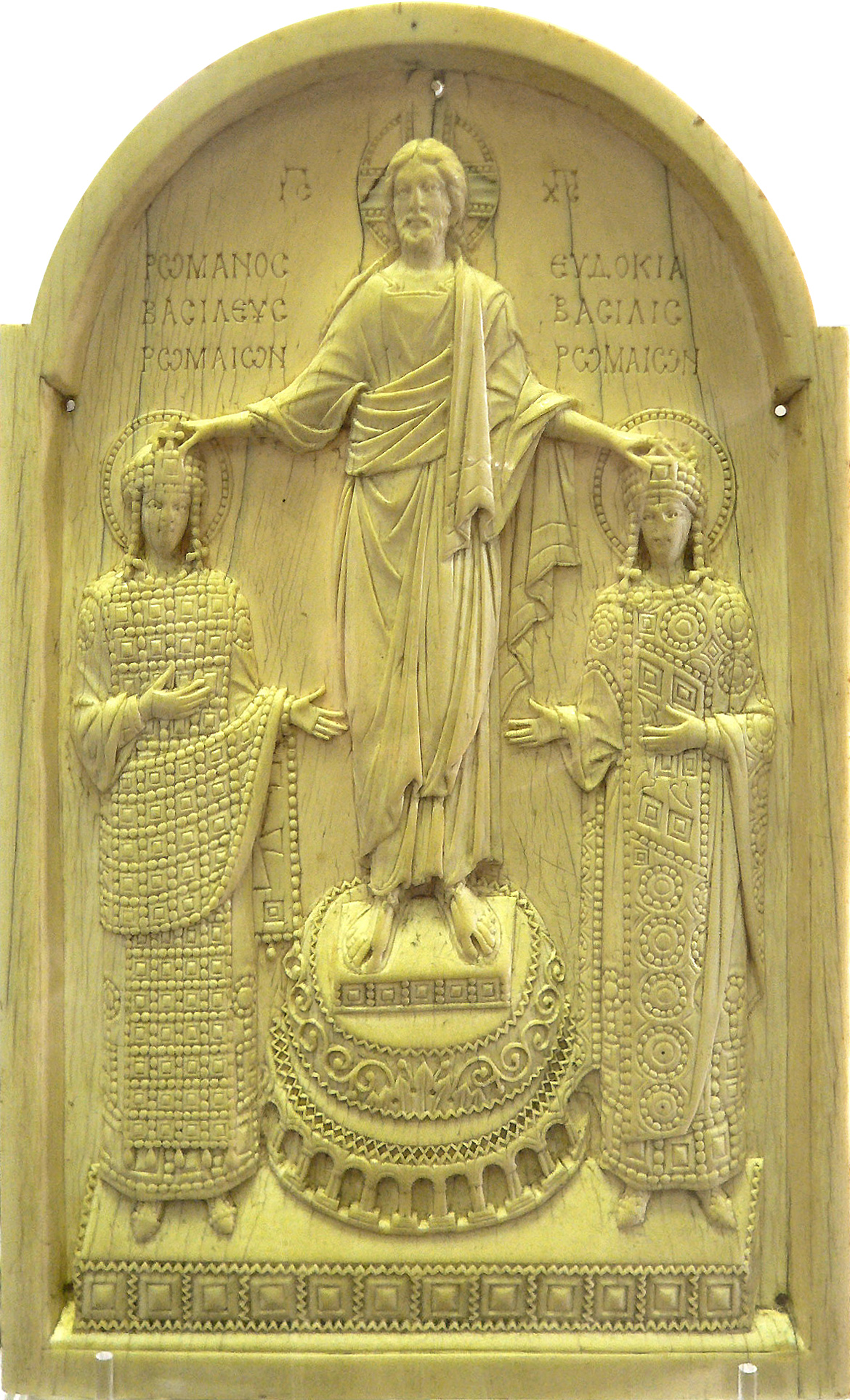
The Romanos and Eudoxia plaque, BnF Paris, from which this group of ivories takes its name.
