= Romanos Ivory =

Carved ivory relief panel from the Byzantine Empire

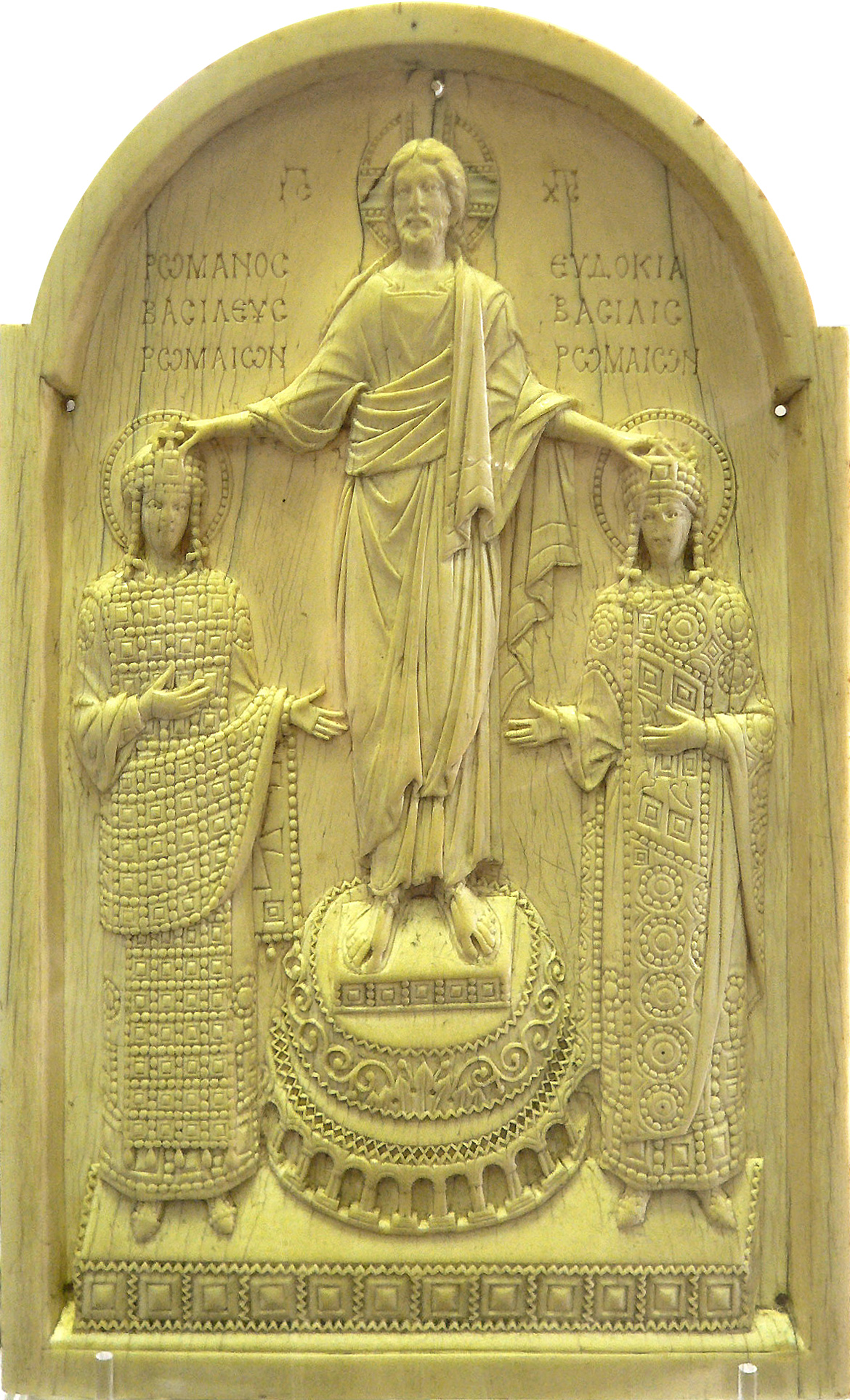
Romanos Ivory depicting Christ blessing Romanos and Eudokia.

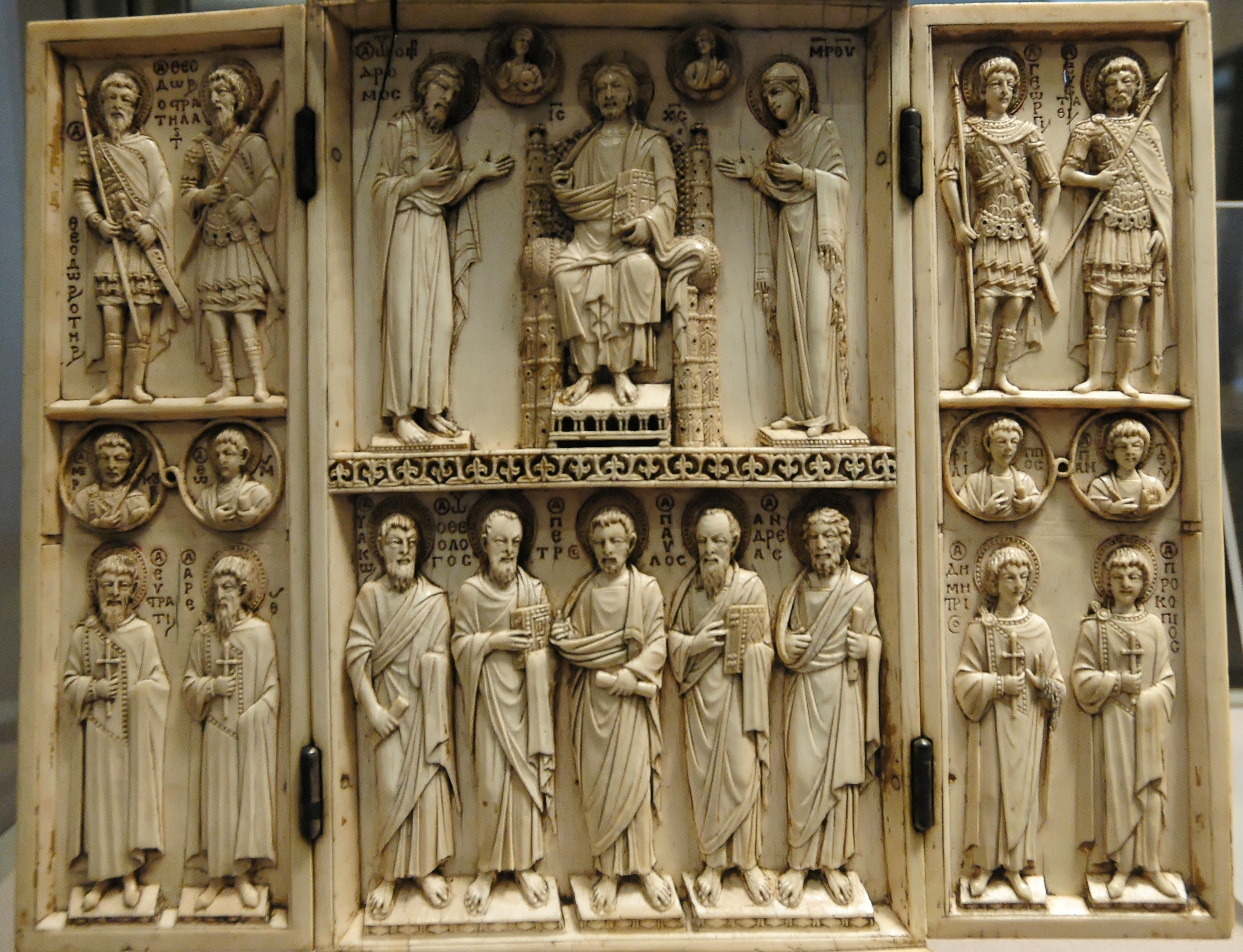
Harbaville Triptych, 28 x 24 cm.

The Romanos Ivory is a carved ivory relief panel from the Byzantine Empire measuring 24.6 cm (at the highest) by 15.5 cm and 1.2 cm thick. The panel is currently in the Cabinet des Médailles of Paris. Inscriptions name the figures of the emperor Romanos and his wife Eudokia, who are being blessed by Christ. However, there were two imperial couples by these names and scholars have yet to agree which is shown. It was first believed to represent Romanos IV and therefore dated between 1068 and 1071. Discoveries of other carved relief works in the 20th century led researchers to think that it represents the earlier Romanos II and his wife Bertha-Eudokia, changing the date of creation to somewhere between 945 and 949.

== Romanos IV and Eudokia Makrembolitissa ==
Until 1926, this panel was assumed to be depicting the coronation and/or marriage of Romanos IV Diogenes and Eudokia Makrembolitissa, mainly due to the inscription over Eudokia’s head which reads “Basilis Rhomaion”. Basilis (and Basilissa) was a title commonly used by women who were regents for their minor sons, which Eudokia Makrembolitissa was at the time of her marriage to Romanos IV. On coinage, the term was used by two other women, both of whom assumed the throne as sole rulers or regents for their sons during their lifetime. The image of this double coronation was also used on seals and the coinage of the realm to both promote Eudokia’s power and legitimize Romanos IV as emperor.

== Iconography and style ==
Contemporary scholarship on this piece asserts that this work represents the coronation of junior emperor Romanos II and his child bride, Bertha (the daughter of King Hugh of Italy), who was renamed "Eudokia" on her arrival at court. Stating that “emperors are always shown more or less as they looked”, scholars point to the fact that the Romanos depicted on the Ivory is beardless, and therefore more likely to be Romanos II, who was only six years old by the time of his coronation in Easter 945 CE. In contrast, the later Romanos IV would have been about 30 and had a full beard. There is also some allusion to the Eudokia figure’s ‘child-like features’. Costuming of the couple also favors the Romanos II theory, as Romanos is shown wearing a loros while Eudokia wears a chlamys, signifying she is subordinate in rank to the senior empress, Helena. It is therefore assumed that this is the only surviving imperial portrait where Christ is crowning a junior emperor and empress.

Some scholarship links the style of the Romanos Ivory to other surviving works of Byzantine art that are more certainly dated in the 10th century. An ivory plaque ordered as part of an epistolary by Sigebert, bishop of Minden (1022–1036) is part of such a group, and Cutler states “if… the central portion of the triptych that had arrived in the west before the death of Sigebert of Minden in 1036, it follows that the Romanos Ivory could not have been made in the second half of the 11th century”. This claim also fits with other assertions that metal and steatite were favored over ivory as a medium by the 11th century. There are currently no other recorded works where a wife of a crown prince was portrayed, nor a junior emperor without the senior.

However, others note that the ivory more stylistically resembles other works dated in the second half of the 11th century such as the Harbaville Triptych and at least two other Byzantine era triptychs, while noting that 10th-century carving was more flat and use less undercutting than is seen on the Romanos Ivory. Facial types and other stylistic details have also been related to works of the late 11th century.

A gold solidus of Romanos II found in 1936 makes it even more probable that he is the emperor depicted in the Ivory, as it shows that he actively attempted to replicate the portraiture of his father, Constantine VII. The Romanos Ivory would then be an imitation of Constantine's own ivory relief, which also depicts him being crowned by Christ.
