= St. Sophia Cathedral (Almaty) =

Coordinates: 43°16′11″N 76°57′31″E

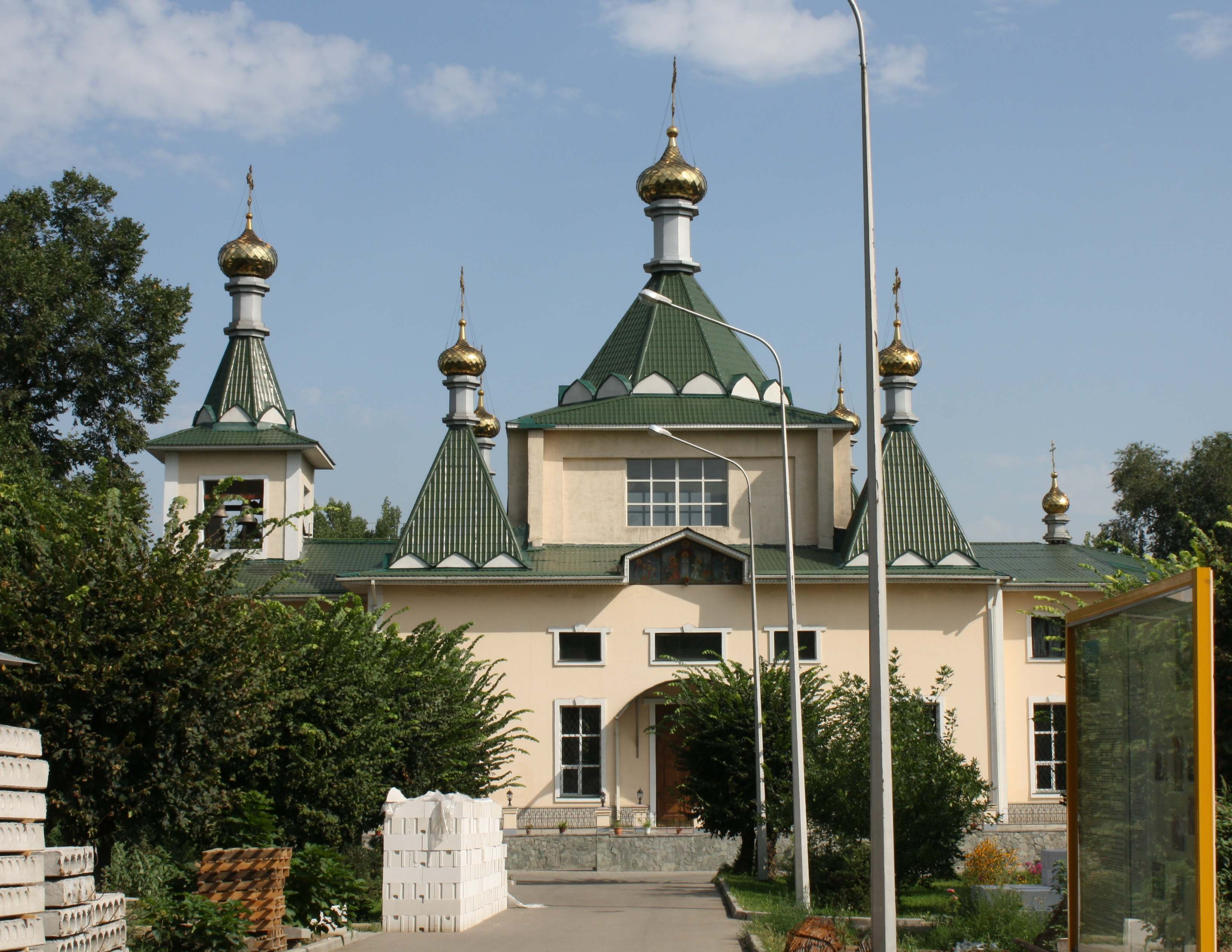
- St. Sophia Cathedral
- Location: Almaty city
- Country: Kazakhstan
- Denomination: Russian Orthodox Church

History
- Founded: 1887

Administration
- Diocese: Astana and Almaty

The St. Sophia Cathedral, dedicated to the martyrs Vera, Nadezhda, Lyubov (known as the Saints Faith, Hope and Charity) and their mother Sophia of Rome, is the cathedral of the Astany and Almaty diocese, located in the city of Almaty, Kazakhstan.

== History ==
=== The Verny Strengthening House of Prayer ===
In 1856 the Verny prayer house was built, which became the first temple of the city. Architects: Leonard Alexandrovsky and Cesar Gumnitsky.

Judging by the drawings of Pavel Mikhailovich Kosharov, who accompanied the traveler and explorer of the Semirechensk region Petr Petrovich Semenov-Tyanshansky in 1857, it was a one-story wooden building, rectangular in plan, with an elevation above the central part.

The first liturgy was served there by the appointed Tomsk priest Eutykhiy Vysheslavsky with two acolytes. All orders he received from Semipalatinsk Ecclesiastical Board, although this dependence, given the dangerous and inconvenient ways of communication with Semipalatinsk, was little felt. For the priest the actual management was the chief of Zailijsky detachment, army petty officer Dmitry Afanasevich Shaitanov (appointed in 1855), and at first residing in Kopal dean.

14 (27) November 14, 1858 by Imperial command of the prayer house was converted into a church of the fortification of the Faith, Hope and Love, and added a parish of the two acolytes.

In 1864, the transfer of the church building was built Church in the name of the icon of Our Lady of Kazan. The building of the church was moved to Malo-Almaty stanitsa, in its place began construction of a temple of burnt bricks.

Until 1872 it was the only church in Vernyi. Its parish included Malo-Almaty village, Sofiyskaya village, Nadejny village, Lyubovny village, and Iliysky village.

=== Turkestan Cathedral ===
In 1871 the stanitsa church of Almaty was erected and consecrated on December 23 under the same name and in the same place. It was built of burnt brick, with the same bell tower and wooden dome, with 7 bells. The priest Alexander Vekshin took over the rectory. The church was given an antimins, priestly ordained by Platon, Bishop of Tomsk and Semipalatinsk.

Initially the parish churches and clergy of the Turkestan Governorate-General belonged to the department of the Orenburg and Tomsk diocesan administrations. The Zailiya and Lepsinsk (Irjar) parish in the Semirechenskaya oblast were subordinated to the Tomsk diocese of the Barnaul diocesan board, and the Syr-Darya parish in the Syr-Darya oblast to the Orenburg diocese.

On May 4, 1871, by the intercession of the Turkestan Governor-General Kaufman, the Turkestan diocese with the residence of the Archbishop in Verny was established.

The first bishop of Turkestan and Tashkent was Sofonia (Sokolsky), vicar of Kherson diocese, who arrived in Verny in May 1872. He turned Sofia church in Turkestan Cathedral.

December 20, 1873 imperial commandment on the establishment of a common army holiday of the Semirechenskaya Cossack Army on the day of the Holy Great Martyr and Victory Bearer George - April 23. In 1874 on donations, and on 200 rubles appropriated from the army capital has been ordered and in 1877 the army image of Sacred George which in the big art carved kote, has been solemnly established in church Big Almatinsky village.

On May 28, 1887, during the Vernensk earthquake of 1887, the cathedral was completely destroyed. On the square near the church are buried in a mass grave about 300 residents of the Bolshe-Almaty village, who died in the earthquake. The study of the structures of the surviving buildings and their comparison with the lost houses showed that the stone buildings suffered much more than the wooden ones.

=== The Church of St. Sophia in Greater Almata ===
After the earthquake, residents of the village used a temporary church, which was placed in the building of the village administration and was consecrated in the name of Nicholas the Wonderworker.

In 1893, in place of the destroyed temple was laid a new one, made of Tien-Shan fir, designed by architect Vyacheslav Nikolayevich Brusentsov. In the southern part of the temple was located necropolis, in which rested the remains of the first bishops of Verninsk Sophony Sokolsky and Nikon Bogoyavlensky. The new temple was completed in 1895. By that time the city authorities decided to build a new cathedral in another part of the city and St. Sophia Church lost its status.

15 (28) February 1911 to commemorate the fiftieth anniversary of the victory, won by a handful of Cossacks over the hordes of Kokand Khan, was erected in the stanitsa cathedral of the Semirechenskaya Cossack troops.

=== Iberian-Seraphim Monastery ===
By decree of the Holy Synod on December 20, 1908 at the territory of the cathedral was founded Iberian-Seraphim monastery. At first - as a women's community at Vsekhsviatskaya church near the city cemetery on Tashkent alley. Experienced nun Nectaria, who came from Stavropol Ioanno-Mariinsky nunnery, became the abbess of the monastery. In 1910, the community, at the request of Bishop Demetrius of Turkestan (Abashidze), was converted to a women's monastery, where over 100 nuns lived.

Processions, with two to three thousand participants, took place from 1912 until the closure of the monastery after the October revolt. From September 1918, the monastery existed as a commune, and in the spring of 1921, the monastery was closed.

=== After the Revolution ===
After the February Revolution, services continued to be held in the cathedral. In the mid-20s it was seized by the Renovationists. In 1929 and 1931 the authorities attempted to close the cathedral, and finally did so in 1937. The clergy of the Church of the Renewal were arrested and shot.

After the closing the building was turned into a club of Red Partisans, then into a cinema "Drummer", then a puppet theater was placed inside its walls. During the installation of a sound cinema "Drummer", the graves of the high priests of the diocese Sophony and Nikon, honorary citizens of Verny and the victims of the earthquake of 1910-11, were desecrated and destroyed.

In the late 1980s the building of the temple came into disrepair, which contributed to the local residents pulling the building. To save the former cathedral from complete destruction, the Ministry of Culture of the KazSSR had to introduce the post of watchman to save the building, which was included in the list of protected monuments of culture and architecture before restoration began. In the conditions of political and economic crisis at the turn of 1980s and 1990s not only the restoration was not carried out but the building was excluded from the register of the monuments and the position of the watchman was abolished.

=== Restoration of the cathedral ===
In November 2003, there was a proposal to restore the nunnery and St. Sophia Cathedral on its territory. In 2004, the foundation was laid, and in 2007, the restored temple was consecrated. It was built entirely according to the old design, only with modern materials.

In the spring of 2006, new bells were consecrated, with a total weight of more than three tons. The weight of the largest one is 1600 kilograms and is the largest bell in Kazakhstan.

In 2011, relics of saints Vera, Nadezhda, Lyubov and Sofia from the Konstantino-Eleninskiy Convent near St. Petersburg were donated to the monastery for safekeeping.

On October 4, 2019, the miracle-working Kursk-Root Icon of the Blessed Virgin Mary "The Sign" was delivered to the cathedral.
