= Romanos II =

Byzantine emperor from 959 to 963

- Emperor and Autocrat of the Romans
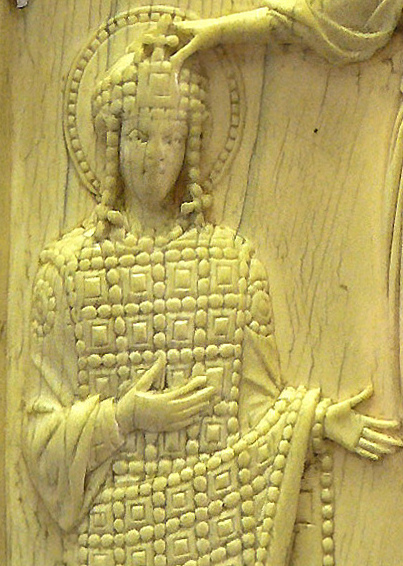
- Idealized portrait of a young Romanos II (aged 7–11), from the Romanos Ivory, AD 945–949

Byzantine emperor
- Reign: 9 November 959 – 15 March 963
- Coronation: 6 April 945 as co-emperor
- Predecessor: Constantine VII
- Successor: Nikephoros II
- Co-emperors: Constantine VII (945–959); Basil II (960–963); Constantine VIII (962–963)
- Born: 938
- Died: 15 March 963 (aged 24–25)
- Spouse: Bertha-Eudokia; Theophano
- Issue: Helena; Basil II; Constantine VIII; Anna Porphyrogenita
- Dynasty: Macedonian
- Father: Constantine VII
- Mother: Helena Lekapene

Romanos II (Greek: Ῥωμανός, romanized: Rōmanos; 938 – 15 March 963) was Byzantine Emperor from 959 to 963. He succeeded his father Constantine VII at the age of twenty-one and died suddenly and mysteriously four years later. His wife Theophano helped their sons Basil II and Constantine VIII ultimately succeed him in 976.

== Life ==
Romanos II was a son of the Emperor Constantine VII and Helena Lekapene, the daughter of Emperor Romanos I Lekapenos and his wife Theodora. The Theophanes Continuatus states that he was 21 years old at the time of his accession in 959, meaning that he was born in 938. Named after his maternal grandfather, Romanos was married, as a child, to Bertha, the illegitimate daughter of King Hugh of Italy, to bond an alliance. She had changed her name to Eudokia after their marriage, but died an early death in 949, which caused the dissolution of the alliance.

On 27 January 945, Constantine VII succeeded in removing his brothers-in-law, the sons of Romanos I, assuming the throne alone. On 6 April 945 (Easter), Constantine crowned his son co-emperor. With Hugh out of power in Italy and dead by 947, Romanos secured the promise from his father that he would be allowed to select his own bride. Romanos chose a woman named Anastaso, whom he married in 956 and renamed Theophano.

In November 959, Romanos II succeeded his father on the throne amidst rumors that he or his wife had poisoned him. Romanos purged his father's courtiers of his enemies and replaced them with friends. To appease his bespelling wife, he excused his mother, Empress Helena, from court and forced his five sisters into convents. Nevertheless, many of Romanos's appointees were able men, including his chief adviser, the eunuch Joseph Bringas.

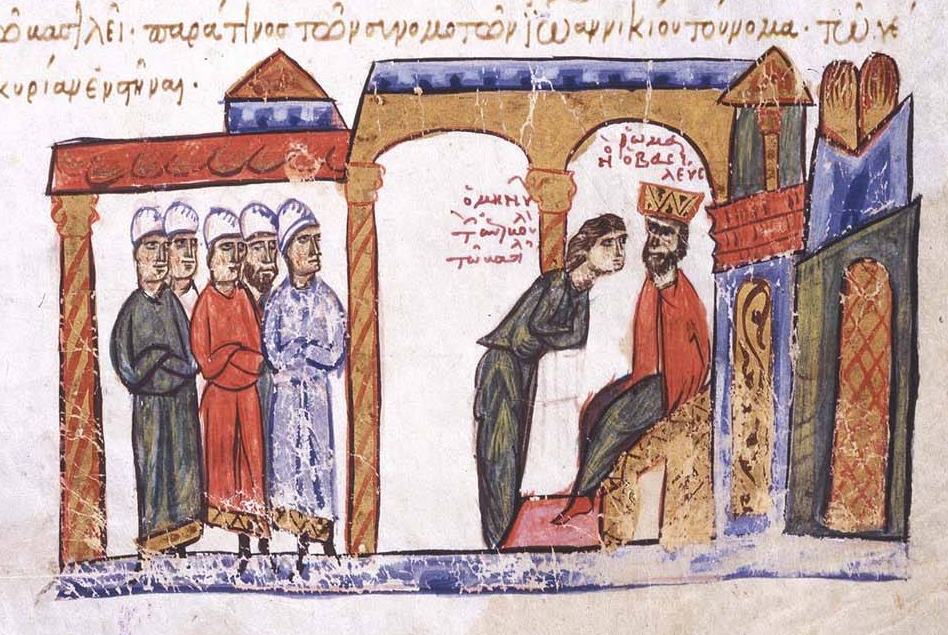
The courtier Ioannikios informs Romanos of a plot against him.

The pleasure-loving sovereign could also leave military matters in the adept hands of his generals, in particular the brothers Leo and Nikephoros Phokas. In 960 Nikephoros Phokas was sent to Crete with a fleet that was considered by contemporary historians as notably large, but probably not comprising more than 25,000–30,000 soldiers and sailors in total. After a difficult campaign and nine-month Siege of Chandax, Nikephoros successfully re-established Byzantine control over the entire island in 961. Following a triumph celebrated at Constantinople, Nikephoros was sent to the eastern frontier, where the Emir of Aleppo Sayf al-Dawla was engaged in annual raids into Byzantine Anatolia. Nikephoros took Cilicia and even Aleppo in 962, sacking the palace of the Emir and taking possession of his treasures. In the meantime Leo Phokas and Marianos Argyros had countered Magyar incursions into the Byzantine Balkans.

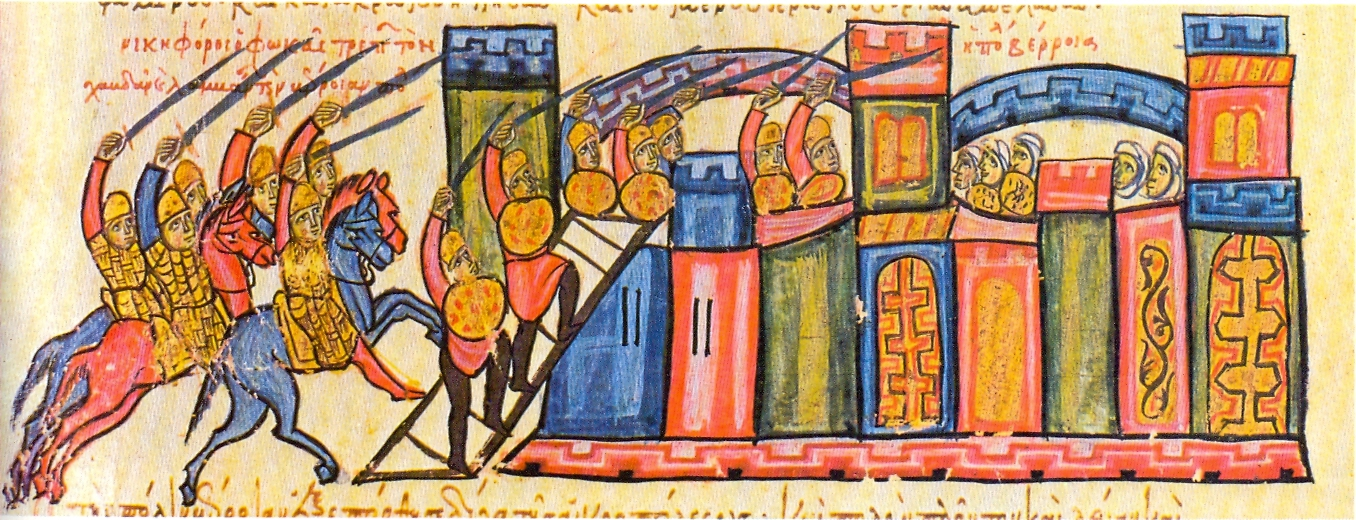
The army under Nikephoros Phokas captures Aleppo.

After a lengthy hunting expedition Romanos II took ill and died on 15 March 963. Rumor attributed his death to poison administered by his wife Theophano, but there is no evidence of this, and Theophano would have been risking much by exchanging the secure status of a crowned Augusta with the precarious one of a widowed regent of her very young children.

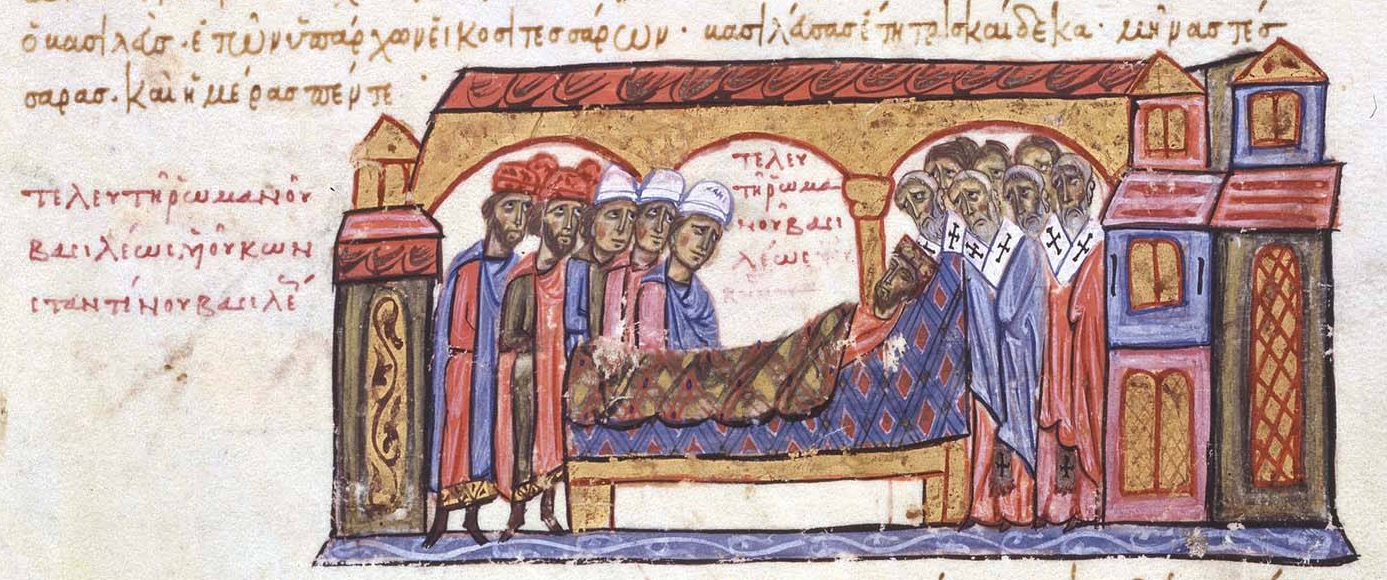
Death of Romanos II

Romanos II's reliance on his wife and on bureaucrats like Joseph Bringas had resulted in a relatively capable administration, but this built up resentment among the nobility, which was associated with the military. In the wake of Romanos's death, his Empress Dowager, now regent to the two co-emperors, her underage sons, was quick to marry the general Nikephoros Phokas and to acquire another general, John Tzimiskes, as her lover, having them both elevated to the imperial throne in succession. The rights of her sons were safeguarded, however, and eventually, when Tzimiskes died at war, her eldest son Basil II became senior emperor.

== Family ==
Romanos's first marriage, in September 944, was to Bertha-Eudokia, illegitimate daughter of King Hugh of Italy. She changed her name from Bertha to Eudokia after her marriage. She died in 949, her marriage unconsummated.

By his second wife Theophano he had at least four children:

- Helena, born c. 955
- Basil II, born in 958
- Constantine VIII, born in 960
- Anna Porphyrogenita, born 13 March 963

== Gallery ==
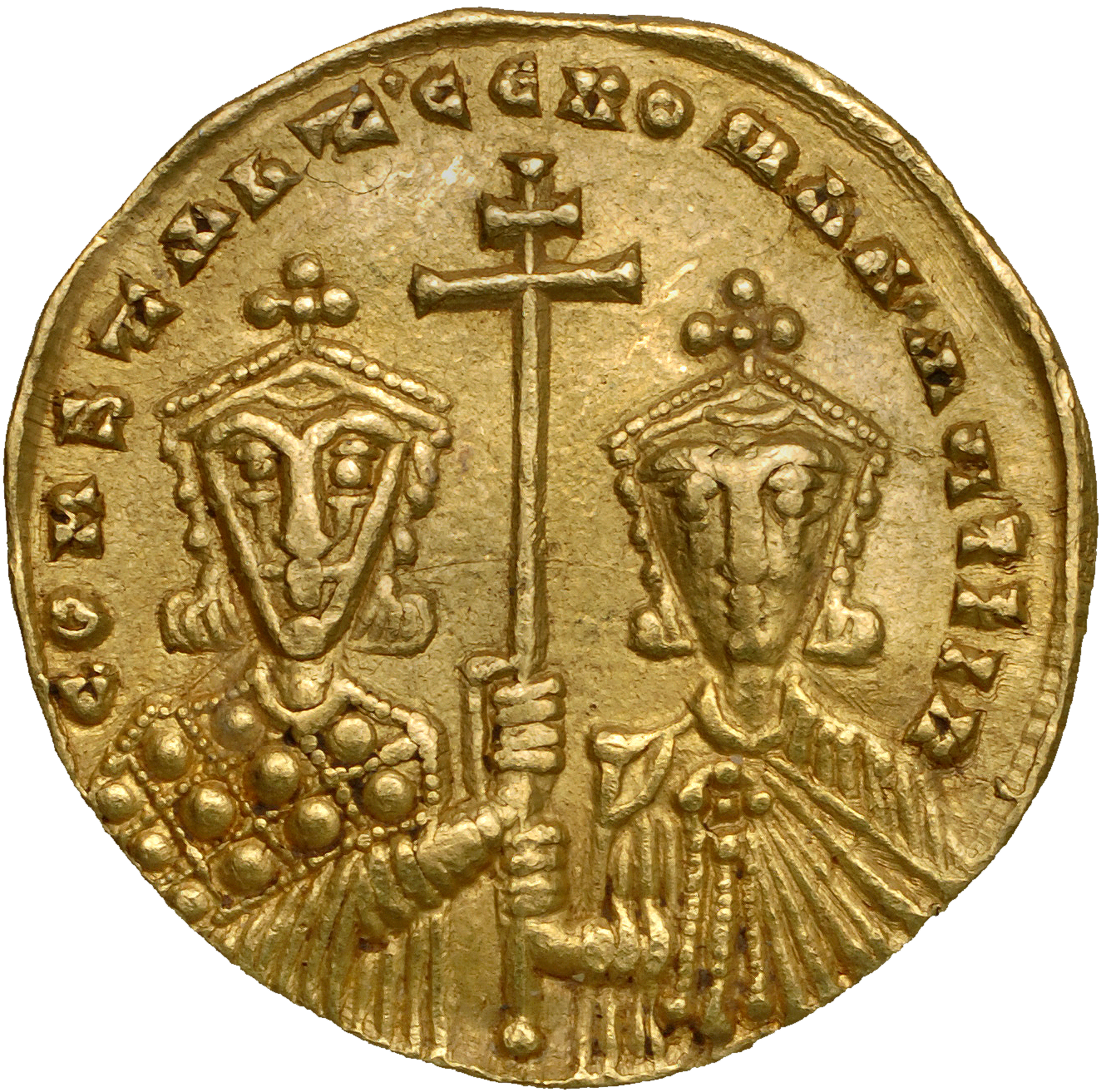
Gold solidus depicting Constantine VII with Romanos II, 945–959.

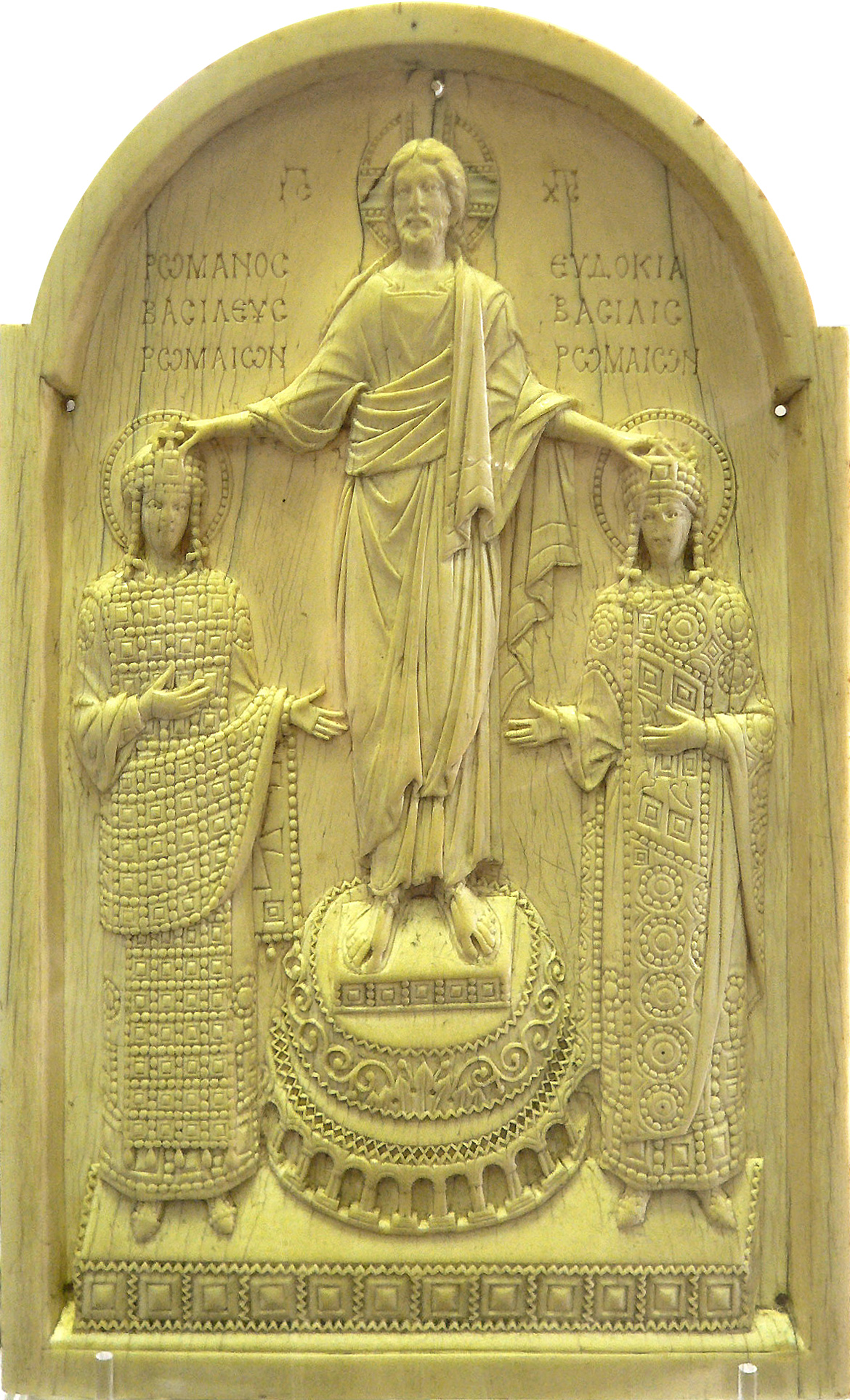
The Romanos Ivory, 945–949.

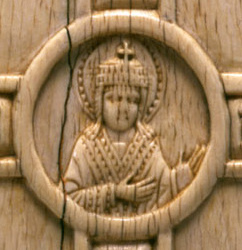
Depiction of a young Romanos II on an Ivory plaque, c. 945–959.

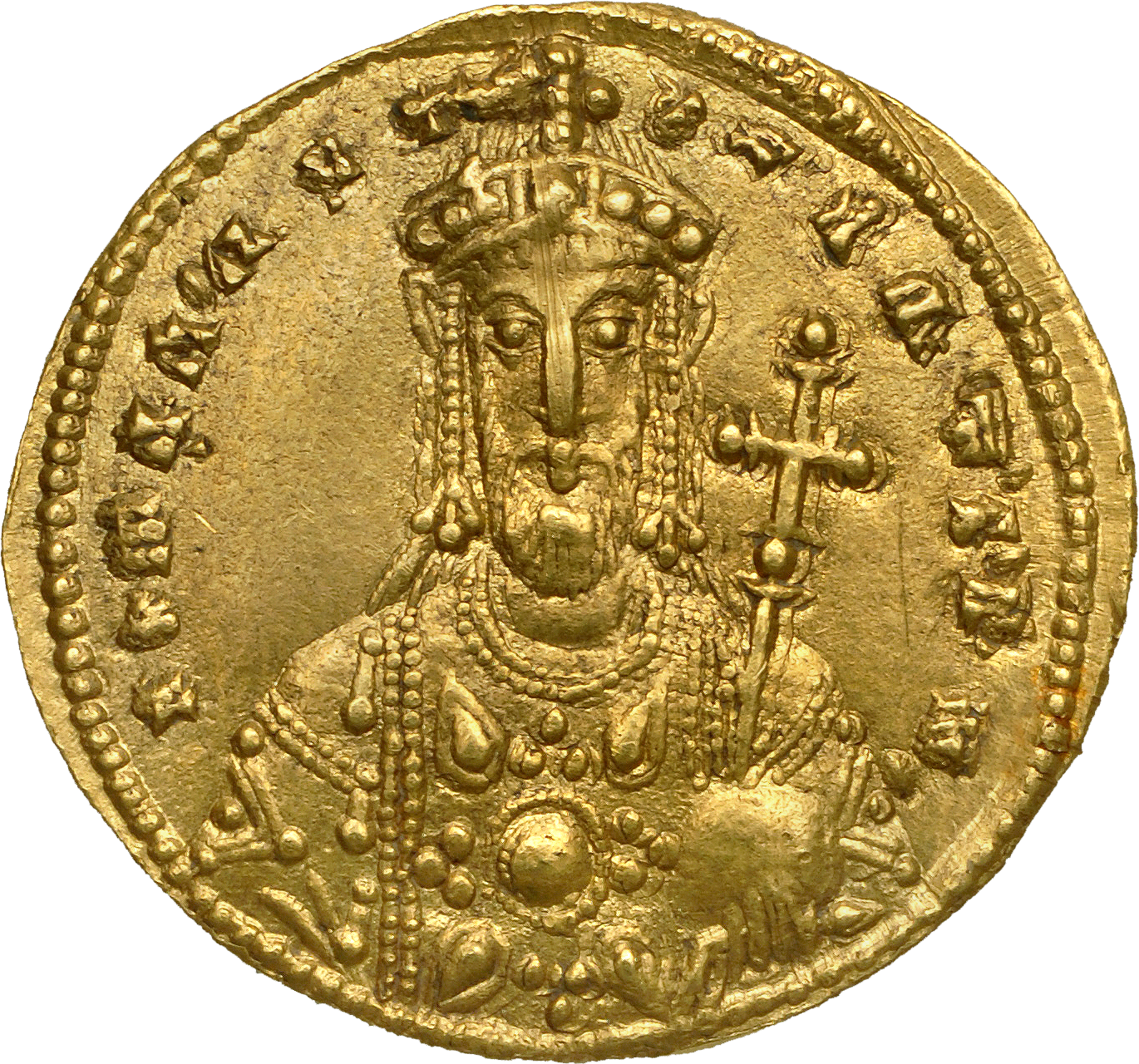
Solidus of Romanos II as sole ruler, 959–963.

== Notes ==
1. According to Edward Gibbon, "after a reign of four years, she mingled for her husband the same deadly draught which she had composed for his father."
2. Byzantine historian George Kedrenos recorded that that "filia Hugonis", married to "Romano", died a virgin. Liudprandi Antapodosis III.39, Monumenta Germaniæ Historica Scriptorum III, p. 312.
3. Theophanes Continuatus records the marriage in September 944 of "Hugonem regem Franciæ...filiam" and "Romanus imperator...Romano Constantini generi sui filio", stating that she lived five years with her husband, although he confuses the identity of Bertha's father. Theophanes Continuatus, VI, Romani imperium, 46, p. 431.
4. "Anno mundi 6471 mortuus est Romanus imperator, 15 die Martii mensis. indictione 6, annos natus 24. imperavit annos 3, menses 4, dies 5." [10 November 959 − 15 March 963]

== Sources ==
=== Primary ===
- Leo the Deacon, Histories
- Skylitzes, John (c. 1057). Synopsis of Histories. Translated by John Wortley. Cambridge University Press. ISBN 9780511779657.
- Georgius Cedrenus (c. 1961). Corpus Scriptorum Historiae Byzantinae. Vol. 9.

=== Modern books ===
- Cotsonis, John A. (1994). Byzantine Figural Processional Crosses. Washington, D.C.: Dumbarton Oaks. ISBN 9780884022282.
- Garland, Lynda (2002). Byzantine Empresses: Women and Power in Byzantium AD 527–1204. Routledge. ISBN 978-1134756384.
- Garland, Lynda (2014) [1999]. Byzantine Empresses: Women and Power in Byzantium AD 527–1204. Routledge. ISBN 978-1-134-75639-1.
- Gibbon, Edward (1904). The Rise and Fall of the Roman Empire. Vol. V. London: Ballantyne, Hanson & CO.
- Jestice, Phyllis G. (2018). Imperial Ladies of the Ottonian Dynasty: Women and Rule in Tenth-Century Germany. Palgrave Macmillan. ISBN 978-3-319-77306-3.
- McMahon, Lucas (2021). "Logistical modelling of a sea-borne expedition in the Mediterranean: the case of the Byzantine invasion of Crete in AD 960". Mediterranean Historical Review. 36 (1): 63–94. doi:10.1080/09518967.2021.1900171.
- Lilie, Ralph-Johannes; Ludwig, Claudia; Zielke, Beate; Pratsch, Thomas, eds. (2013). "Romanos II. (#26834)". Prosopographie der mittelbyzantinischen Zeit (in German). De Gruyter.
- Ostrogorsky, George (1968). History of Byzantine. New Brunswick: Rutgers University Press. ISBN 0-8135-0599-2.
- Reuter, Timothy; McKitterick, Rosamond, eds. (1999). "Appendix". The New Cambridge Medieval History: Volume 3, c. 900 – c. 1024. Cambridge University Press.

=== Attribution ===
- This article incorporates text from a publication now in the public domain: Chisholm, Hugh, ed. (1911). "Romanus". Encyclopædia Britannica. Vol. 23 (11th ed.). Cambridge University Press. pp. 583–584.

Romanos II Macedonian Dynasty Born: 938 Died: 963
Regnal titles
Preceded by Constantine VII	Byzantine emperor 959–963 (with Basil II, and Constantine VIII)	Succeeded by Nikephoros II Phokas
