= Bertha-Eudokia =

10th-century Byzantine empress

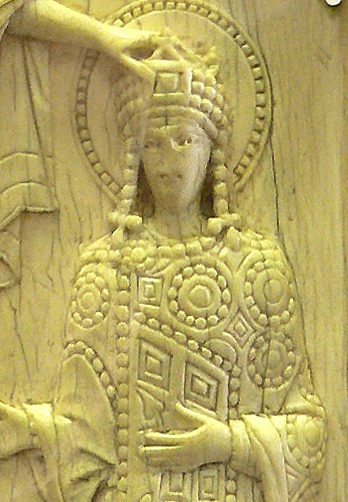
Idealized portrait of a young Bertha-Eudokia, from the Romanos Ivory, AD 945–949

Eudokia, originally named Bertha, was the first wife of the Byzantine emperor Romanos II. She was the illegitimate daughter of King Hugh of Italy and his concubine Pezola. In September 944, she married Romanos, who became the junior co-emperor in 945. Upon becoming the wife of Romanos, she was renamed Eudokia.

Bertha was born after 937. Her marriage was arranged around 940, during negotiations for a military alliance between Hugh and Romanos I against the Saracens of Fraxinetum. Romanos proposed the marriage for his grandson, Romanos II. Bertha was chosen because Hugh had no legitimate daughter at the time. The contemporary chronicler Liutprand of Cremona refers to her mother, Pezola, as a meretrix ('prostitute') and a serf. She was apparently a concubine, as she and Hugh also had a son named Boso, who became bishop of Piacenza. The De Administrando Imperio of Romanos II's father, Constantine VII, includes Bertha's genealogy through her father, emphasising that she was named after her paternal grandmother, Bertha, daughter of Lothair II, through whom she was descended from Charlemagne. From the Byzantine perspective, this was a "prestige match".

Bertha was brought to Constantinople in the spring or summer of 944, escorted by Paschalios, strategos of Longobardia, and Sigefred, bishop of Parma. Her marriage took place in September, after a change of indiction. According to the De Administrando Imperio, she chose the name Eudokia after her husband's great-grandmother, Eudokia Ingerina, and one of his aunts. Sigefred was still in Constantinople during the coup that brought Constantine VII to power in January 945. This resulted in Romanos II's coronation as co-emperor in April 945.

Eudokia is generally thought to be the empress depicted on the Romanos Ivory, which would date it to between 945 and 949. The competing hypothesis is that it depicts Eudokia Makrembolitissa, wife of Romanos IV from a century later. On the ivory, Eudokia is given the Atticizing title basilis, usually reserved for reigning empresses. Maria Parani argues that the ivory may have been a diplomatic gift intended for Hugh and symbolizing the new alliance sealed by marriage. Eudokia may also be mentioned in the Book of Ceremonies. In its description of the visit of Olga of Kiev to Constantinople, the emperor's daughter-in-law is among the members of the imperial family receiving her. If this visit be dated to 946, then the daughter-in-law was Eudokia.

Eudokia was still living in March 949, when an embassy from Emperor Constantine VII to the kingdom of Italy expressed concern that King Lothair II, his daughter-in-law's half-brother, be properly represented by Berengar of Ivrea, who held de facto power in the kingdom. The date of her death is unknown, but probably no later than 950. She was probably not 10 years old. There is a monody written in the name of Romanos II lamenting her death and lauding her quick mastery of Greek. Her epitaph also survives.

== Sources ==
- Bouchard, Constance B. (1988). "The Bosonids or Rising to Power in the Late Carolingian Age". French Historical Studies. 15 (3): 407–431. doi:10.2307/286367. JSTOR 286367.
- Lilie, Ralph-Johannes; Ludwig, Claudia; Pratsch, Thomas; Zielke, Beate (1998–2013). Prosopographie der mittelbyzantinischen Zeit (in German). Berlin and Boston: De Gruyter.
- Kaldellis, Anthony (2024). The New Roman Empire: A History of Byzantium. Oxford University Press.
- Moravscik, Gyula; Jenkins, R. J. H., eds. (1967). Constantine Porphyrogenitus: De Administrando Imperio. Dumbarton Oaks.
- Parani, Maria G. (2001). "The Romanos ivory and the New Tokalı kilise: imperial costume as a tool for dating Byzantine art" (PDF). Cahiers archéologiques. 49: 15–28.
