= Nea Moni of Chios =

11th-century monastery complex on the island of Chios, Greece

- Νέα Μονή
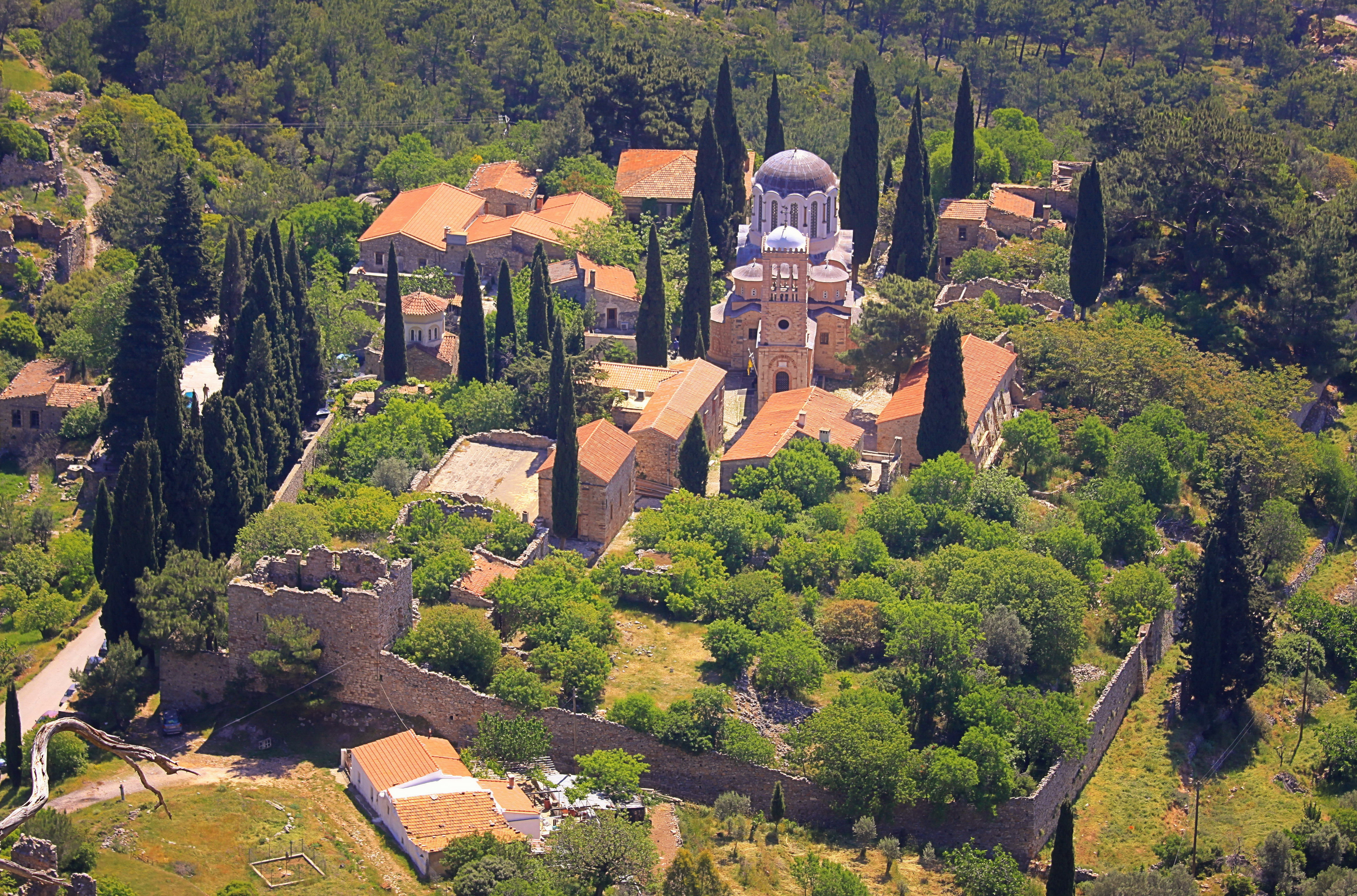
- A view of the complex in 2013

- Location of the complex in Greece
- Nea Moni of Chios
- 38°22′26″N 26°03′20″E
- Location: Chios, North Aegean
- Country: Greece
- Language: Greek
- Denomination: Greek Orthodox
- Website: neamoni.gr (in Greek)

History
- Status: Monastery and katholikon (1049–1952); Convent (since 1952– ); History museum (since 1992– )
- Founder(s): Constantine IX Monomachos and Empress Zoe
- Dedication: Theotokos (monastery)
- Other dedication: Dormition of the Virgin Mary (katholikon)

Architecture
- Functional status: Active (as a convent and museum)
- Architectural type: Monastery
- Style: Byzantine; Macedonian Renaissance
- Groundbreaking: 1042
- Completed: 1049 (monastery and katholikon); 1055 (complex); 1512 (bell tower)
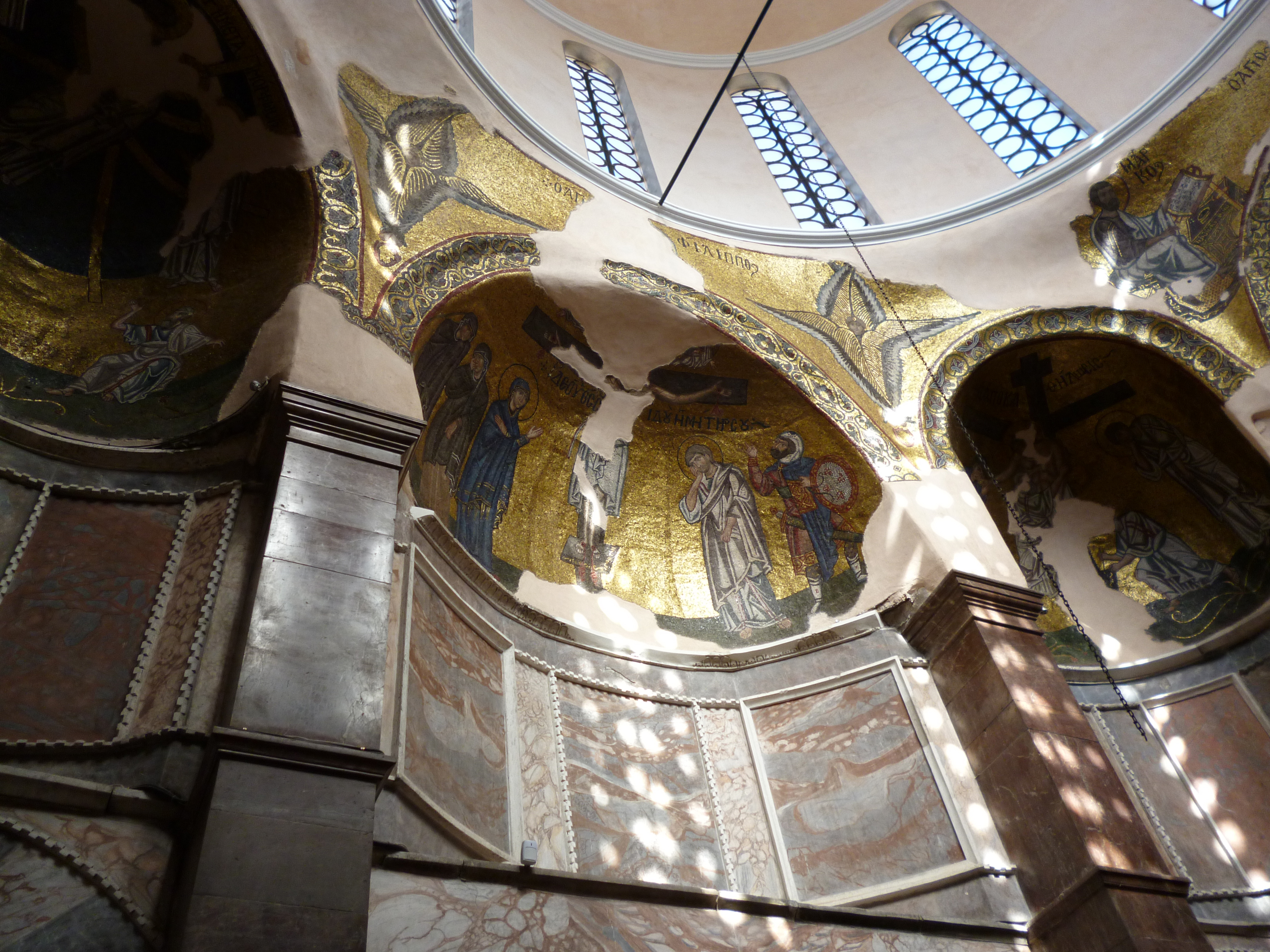
- View of the monastery interior

UNESCO World Heritage Site
- Part of: Monasteries of Daphni, Hosios Loukas and Nea Moni of Chios
- Criteria: Cultural: (i)(iv)
- Reference: 537-003
- Inscription: 1990 (14th Session)
- Area: 1.33 ha (3.3 acres)
- Buffer zone: 372.27 ha (919.9 acres)

Nea Moni (Greek: Νέα Μονή, lit. 'New Monastery') is an 11th-century Greek Orthodox former monastery complex, now convent and history museum, located on the island of Chios, in the North Aegean region of Greece. The complex is located on the Provateio Oros Mt. in the island's interior, approximately 15 kilometres (9.3 mi) from Chios town. Enscribed on the UNESCO World Heritage List in 1990, the monastery complex is renowned for its mosaics, which, together with those at Daphni and Hosios Loukas, are among the finest examples of Macedonian Renaissance art in Greece.

== History ==
The monastery complex was built in the mid-11th century, by Byzantine emperor Constantine IX Monomachos and his wife, Empress Zoe. According to tradition, it was built on the location where three monks, Nikitas, Ioannes, and Iosif, miraculously found an icon of the Virgin Mary hanging from a branch of myrtle. At that time, Constantine was exiled in nearby Lesbos, and the monks visited him and told of a vision according to which he would eventually become emperor. Constantine promised to build a church if this should come to pass. In 1042 Constantine became emperor and, in gratitude, began constructing the monastery dedicated to the Theotokos. The main church (the katholikon) was inaugurated in 1049, and the complex finished in 1055, after Constantine's death.

The monastery was early on endowed with privileges: in a chrysobull of July 1049, Constantine Monomachos granted the monastery the head tax of all Jews of the island of Chios, and set the monastery apart from any superior ecclesiastic or secular hierarchy. As a result of land grants, tax exemptions, and other privileges granted by successive emperors, the monastery prospered during the Byzantine period. Over the centuries, the monastery amassed substantial riches and became one of the wealthiest monasteries in the Aegean. At its peak, in c. 1300, the estates of the monastery covered one third of Chios and it was estimated that up to 800 monks belonged to it.

The subsequent Genoese domination reduced its wealth, but the monastery prospered again during the Ottoman era, when it was subject directly to the Patriarch of Constantinople, and enjoyed considerable autonomy. The late 16th-century traveler Samuel Purchas recounted that it had 200 monks, and that "alone in all Greece they had the right to use bells." During the 17th century the number of monks decreased further, but recovered in the next century. The Patriarch of Jerusalem, Chrysanthos Notaras, and the French priest Fourmont, who visited the monastery in 1725 and 1729 respectively, commented on the large numbers of monks, the quantity of relics preserved, and the beauty of the church and its decoration.

The monastery's decline began only after the destruction of Chios by the Ottomans in April 1822, during the Greek War of Independence. 2,000 people sought refuge in the monastery, but the Ottomans stormed it, slaughtered many, and set fire to the templon and other wooden furnishings of the church, including the roof, leaving the rest of the refugees to burn there. The monastery never recovered its former glory.

In 1881, an earthquake added further damage to the main church, leading to the collapse of its dome, while several other buildings, like the 1512 bell-tower, were destroyed. In 1952, due to the shortage of monks, Nea Moni was converted to a convent. According to the 2001 census, it is inhabited by only three nuns.

== Structures and architecture ==
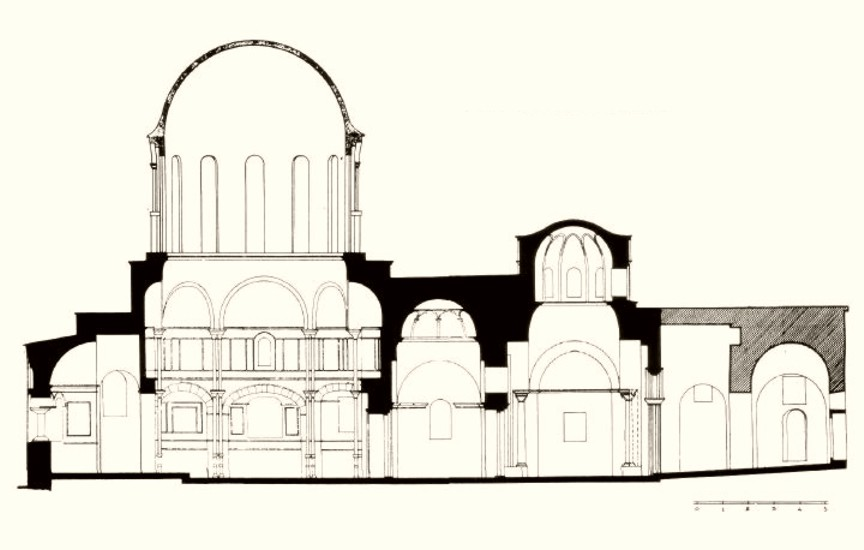
Plan of the katholikon

The monastery complex covers approximately 17,000 square metres (180,000 sq ft) and consists of the katholikon, two smaller churches (dedicated to the Holy Cross and to St Panteleimon) the dining hall (trapeza), the monks' cells (kelia), the reception hall or "triklinon", and an underground water cistern (kinsterna). The complex is surrounded by a wall (the original Byzantine wall was destroyed in 1822), and in the northeastern corner stands a defensive tower, in earlier times used as a library. In addition, outside the walls, near the monks' cemetery, there is a small chapel to St Luke.

The katholikon is the monastery's central structure, dedicated to the Dormition of the Virgin Mary. It is composed of the main church, the esonarthex and the exonarthex. The main church is of an octagonal shape, the so-called "insular" type, found in Chios and Cyprus. Although all three sections date to the 11th century, the main church suffered significant damage in 1822 and 1881, with the result that its current, rebuilt, form is different from the original. The bell tower was constructed in 1900, replacing an older one built in 1512. Originally, the remains of the three founders were kept in the exonarthex, but most of these were destroyed during the sack of 1822.

Along with the katholikon, the only remaining 11th-century buildings are the partially ruined tower, the chapel of St Luke, the cistern, and parts of the trapeza. The cells, most of which are in a ruined state, date to the Venetian and Genovese periods. A small museum, opened in 1992, exists to the northwest of the katholikon, housed in a renovated cell. The displayed artefacts date mostly from the latter 19th century.

== Gallery ==
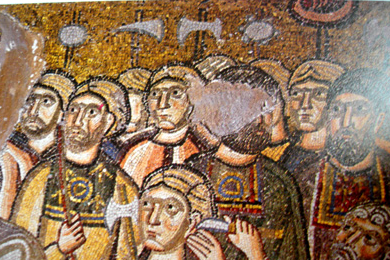
11th-century mosaic of the Arrest of Jesus, in the monastery

The Three Marys mosaic, dated from 1100 CE

== See also ==
- Church of Greece
- List of churches in Greece
- List of museums in Greece
- Ancient Roman and Byzantine domes
