= Byzantine Empire =

Continuation of the Roman Empire (330–1453)

- 330–1453
- The Empire at its greatest territorial extent in 565, at the end of Justinian I's rule
- Capital: Constantinople
- Common languages: Greek, Latin (until the 6th century)
- Religion: Christianity (official)
- Government: Absolute monarchy
- Notable emperors
  - 306–337: Constantine I
  - 379–395: Theodosius I
  - 408–450: Theodosius II
  - 527–565: Justinian I
  - 610–641: Heraclius
  - 717–741: Leo III
  - 963–969: Nikephoros II
  - 969–976: John I
  - 976–1025: Basil II
  - 1081–1118: Alexios I
  - 1118–1143: John II
  - 1143–1180: Manuel I
  - 1261–1282: Michael VIII
  - 1449–1453: Constantine XI
- Historical era: Late antiquity to Late Middle Ages

Population
  - 540: 27 million
  - 800: 12 million
  - 1025: 18 million
  - 1282: 3 to 5 million
  - 1312: 2 million
- Currency: Solidus, follis, and hyperpyron

The Byzantine Empire, also known as the Eastern Roman Empire, was the continuation of the Eastern part of the Roman Empire centred on Constantinople during late antiquity and the Middle Ages. Having survived the fall of the Western Roman Empire in the 5th century AD, it endured until the fall of Constantinople to the Ottoman Empire in 1453. The term 'Byzantine Empire' was coined only after its demise; its citizens used the term 'Roman Empire' and called themselves 'Romans'. (Note: Medieval Greek: Ῥωμαῖοι, romanized: Rhōmaîoi. Due to the imperial seat's move to Byzantium, the adoption of state Christianity, and the predominance of Greek instead of Latin, most historians make a distinction between the earlier Roman Empire and the later Byzantine Empire.)

During the early centuries of the Roman Empire, the western provinces were Latinised, but the eastern parts kept their Hellenistic culture. Constantine I (r. 324–337) legalised Christianity and founded the new Eastern capital of Constantinople. Theodosius I (r. 379–395) made Christianity the state religion and Greek gradually replaced Latin for official use. The empire adopted a defensive strategy and, throughout its remaining history, experienced recurring cycles of decline and recovery.

The Byzantine Empire reached its greatest extent under the reign of Justinian I (r. 527–565), who briefly reconquered much of Italy and the western Mediterranean coast. Around 541, the empire was hit by a plague, and prolonged wars with Persia placed fiscal and military strain on the empire, contributing to political and strategic challenges in the decades that followed. In the 630s and 640s the Arab conquests defeated Byzantine field armies in Syria and Egypt, resulting in the permanent loss of those provinces to the Rashidun Caliphate. In 698, Africa was lost to the Umayyad Caliphate, but the empire stabilised under the Isaurian dynasty. It expanded once more under the Macedonian dynasty, experiencing a two-century-long renaissance. Thereafter, periods of civil war and Seljuk incursion resulted in the loss of most of Asia Minor. The empire recovered during the Komnenian restoration, and Constantinople remained the largest and wealthiest city in Europe until the 13th century, when it was overtaken by Paris.

The empire was severely fragmented in 1204, following the sack of Constantinople during the Fourth Crusade; its former territories were then divided into competing Greek rump states and Latin realms. Despite the eventual recovery of Constantinople in 1261, the reconstituted empire wielded only regional power during its final two centuries. Its remaining territories were progressively annexed by the Ottomans in a series of wars fought in the 14th and 15th centuries. The fall of Constantinople to the Ottomans in 1453 brought the empire to an end.

== Nomenclature ==
The empire's inhabitants, today generally known as Byzantines, regarded themselves as Romans (in Greek, Ῥωμαῖοι or Romaioi). Similarly, their Islamic contemporaries called their empire the "land of the Romans" (Bilād al-Rūm). After 800 AD, Western Europe called them "Greeks" (Graeci), as the Papacy and medieval German emperors regarded themselves as the true inheritors of Roman identity. The adjective "Byzantine", derived from Byzantion (Byzantium in Latin), the name of the Greek settlement Constantinople was established on, was only used to describe the inhabitants of the city; it did not refer to the empire, called Rhomanía (Ῥωμανία or "Romanland") by its citizens.

Following the empire's fall, early modern scholars referred to it by many names, including the "Eastern Empire", the "Low Empire", the "Late Empire", the "Empire of the Greeks", "Empire of Constantinople", and "Roman Empire". The increasing use of "Byzantine" and "Byzantine Empire" may have started with Theodore Metochites or Laonikos Chalkokondyles whose work was widely propagated by Hieronymus Wolf. "Byzantine" was used adjectivally alongside terms such as "Empire of the Greeks" until the 19th century. It is now the primary term, used to refer to all aspects of the empire; some modern historians believe it should not be used because it was originally a prejudicial and inaccurate term.

== History ==
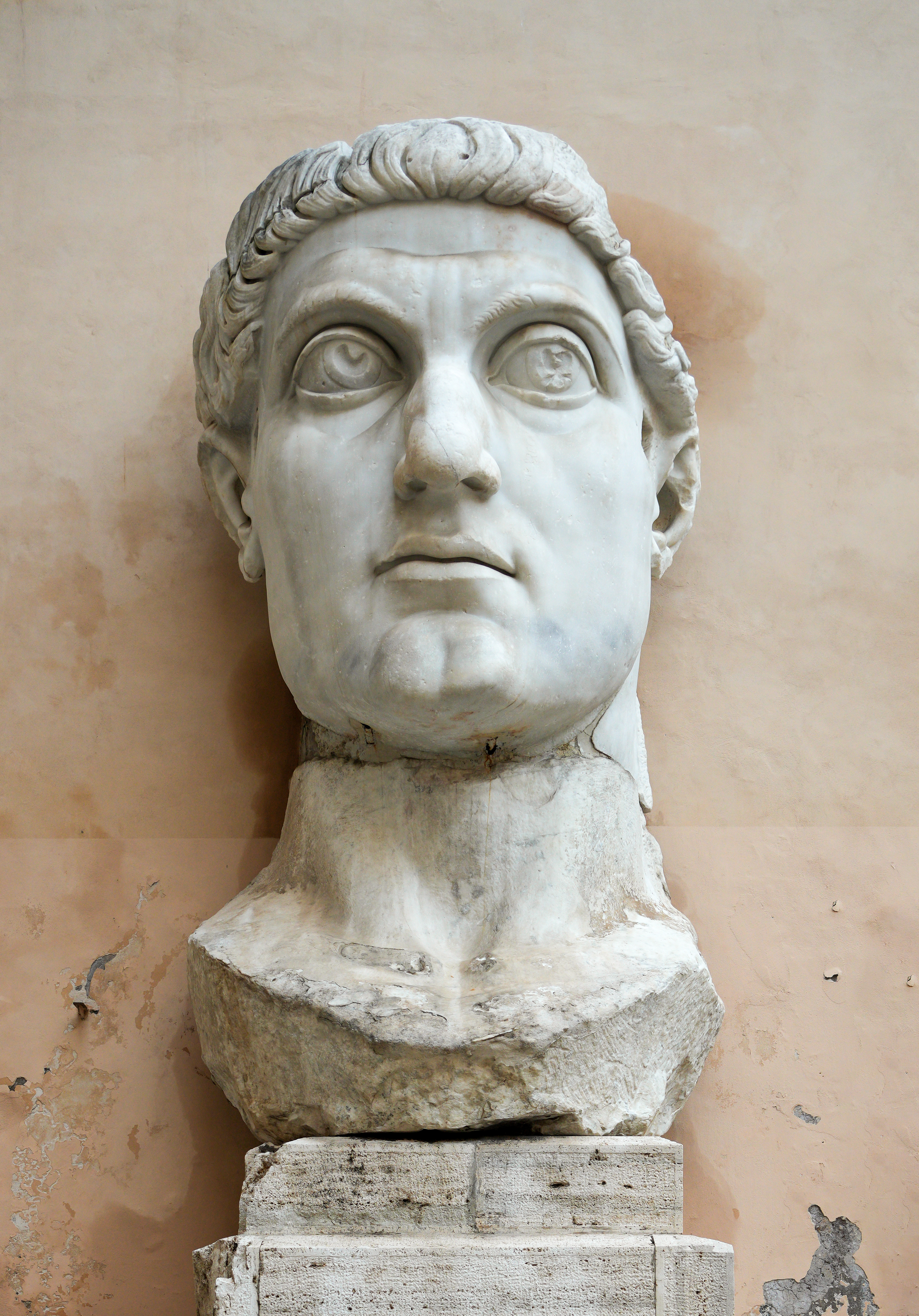
Constantine I, also known as Constantine the Great, was Roman emperor from AD 306 to 337 and the first Roman emperor to convert to Christianity. He founded the city of Constantinople (now Istanbul) and made it the eastern capital of the Empire, which it remained for over a millennium.

=== Start date ===
Given the significant overlap in historiographical periodisations of Late Roman history, late antiquity, and Byzantine history, there is no consensus on a foundation date for the Byzantine Empire. Scholarship with links to Greece or Eastern Orthodoxy has customarily placed it in the early 300s. The growth of the study of "late antiquity" has led to some historians setting a start date in the seventh or eighth centuries. Others believe a "new empire" began during changes c. 300 AD. Geoffrey Greatrex believes that it is impossible to precisely date the foundation of the Byzantine Empire.

=== Pre-518: Constantinian, Theodosian, and Leonid dynasties ===
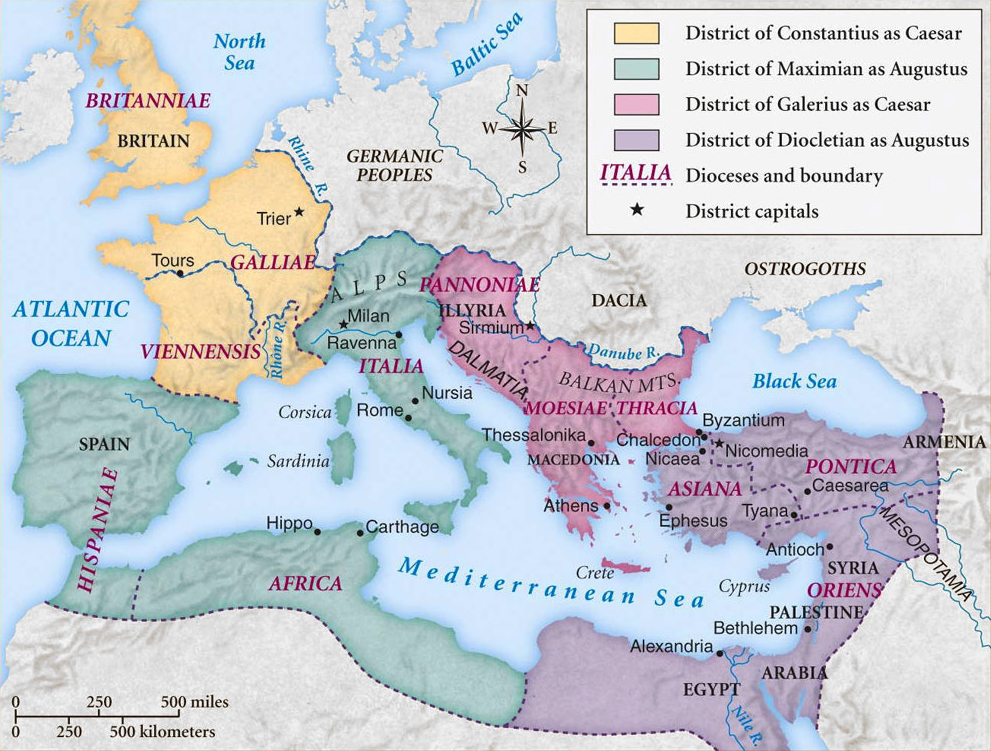
Four-way division of the Roman Empire under the Tetrarchy system established by Diocletian

Between the 3rd and 1st centuries BC, the Roman Republic established hegemony over the eastern Mediterranean, while its government developed into the one-person rule of an emperor. The Roman Empire enjoyed a period of relative stability until the 3rd century AD, when external threats and internal crises caused it to splinter, as regional armies acclaimed their generals as "soldier-emperors". One of these, Diocletian (r. 284–305), recognised that the state was too big to be ruled by a single person. He instituted the Tetrarchy, a system which divided the empire into eastern and western halves. The Tetrarchy quickly failed, but the division of the empire proved an enduring concept.

Constantine I (r. 306–337) secured absolute power in 324. Over the next six years, he rebuilt the city of Byzantium as a new capital that he called "New Rome" (later named Constantinople). The old capital Rome was farther from the prosperous eastern provinces and in a less strategically important location; its esteem had already been somewhat lessened in the eyes of the "soldier-emperors", who ruled from the frontiers, and of the empire's population. Having been granted citizenship, the empire's subjects considered themselves just as Roman as those in the city of Rome. Constantine continued reforms of the empire's military and civil administration and instituted the gold solidus as a stable currency. He favoured Christianity and became an opponent of paganism. Constantine's dynasty prioritised a lengthy conflict against the comparably powerful Sasanid Persia and ended in 363 with the death of his nephew Julian. The reign of the short Valentinianic dynasty, marked by wars against the Goths, religious debates, and anti-corruption campaigns, ended in the East with the death of Valens at the Battle of Adrianople in 378.

Division of the empire after the death of Theodosius I in 395 The Western Roman Empire The Byzantine/Eastern Roman Empire

Valens's successor, Theodosius I (r. 379–395), secured peace in the east by allowing the Goths to settle in Roman territory; he also twice intervened in the western half, defeating the usurpers Magnus Maximus and Eugenius in 388 and 394, respectively. He actively condemned paganism, confirmed the primacy of Nicene Orthodoxy over Arianism in the East, and established Christianity as the Roman state religion. He was the last emperor to rule both the western and eastern halves of the empire. After his death, the West was destabilised but the East thrived due to the civilian administrators who continued to hold power. Theodosius II (r. 408–450) largely left the rule of the East to officials such as Anthemius, who constructed the Theodosian Walls. Constantinople had now entrenched itself as the empire's capital.

Aside from Constantinople's walls, Theodosius' reign was also marked by the compilation of the Codex Theodosianus and the theological dispute over Nestorianism (a doctrine later deemed heretical). His reign also saw the arrival of Attila's Huns, who ravaged the Balkans, leading to a large tribute being exacted from the eastern empire. Attila switched his attention to the rapidly-deteriorating western empire, and his people fractured after his death in 453. Later, Leo I (r. 457–474) failed in his 468 attempt to reconquer the West. The warlord Odoacer deposed Romulus Augustulus in 476 and after the assassination of his titular successor Julius Nepos in 480, abolished the office of western emperor.

Through a combination of fortune and good political decisions, the Eastern Empire never experienced rebellious barbarian vassals or rule by barbarian warlords—the problems which ensured the downfall of the West. Zeno (r. 474–491) convinced the problematic Ostrogoth king Theodoric to take control of Italy from Odoacer; dying when the empire was at peace, he was succeeded by Anastasius I (r. 491–518). His belief in monophysitism brought occasional issues, but Anastasius was a capable administrator and instituted successful financial reforms including the abolition of the chrysargyron tax. He was the first emperor since Diocletian not to face any serious problems affecting the empire during his reign.

=== 518–717: Justinian and Heraclian dynasties ===
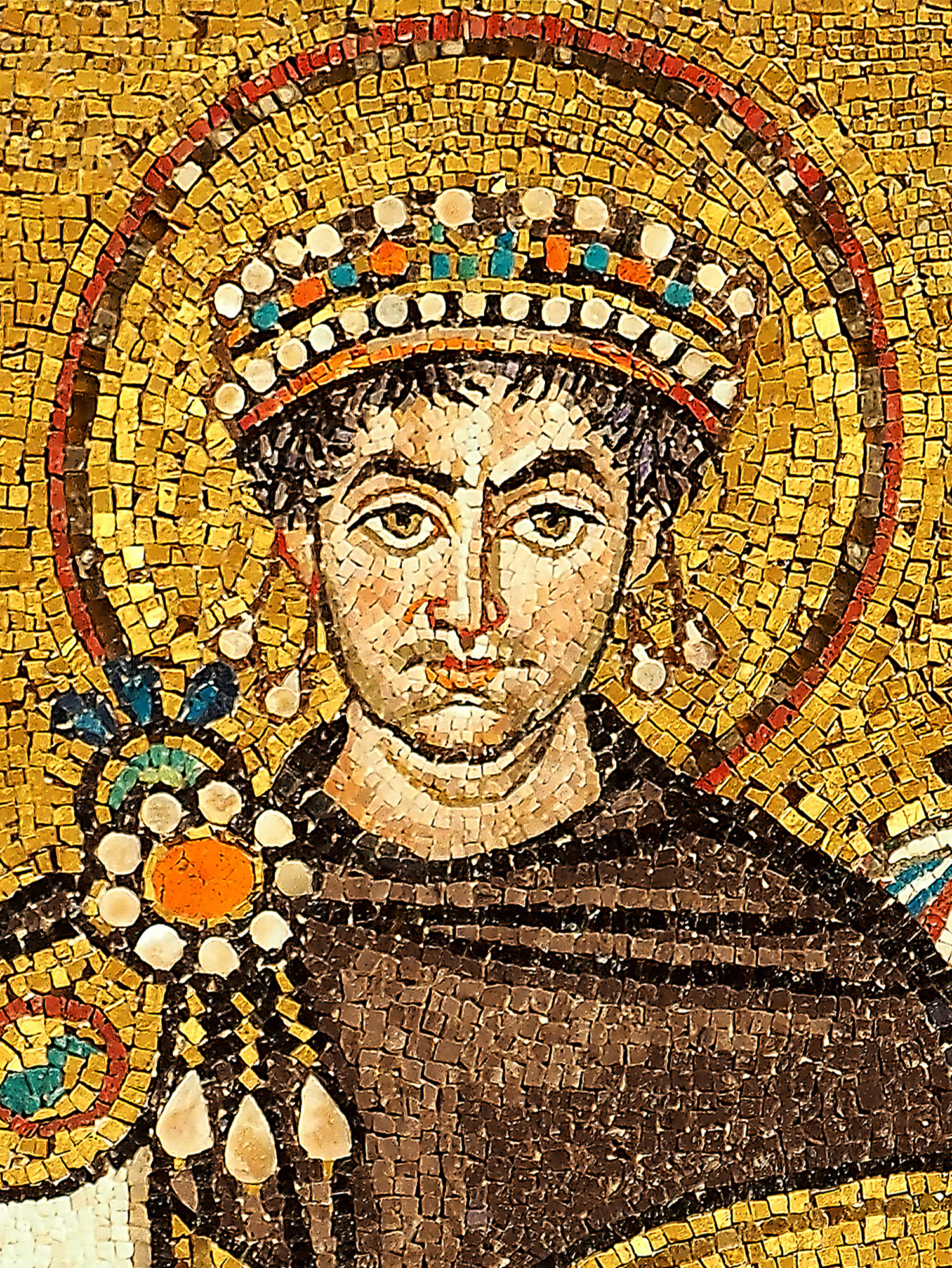
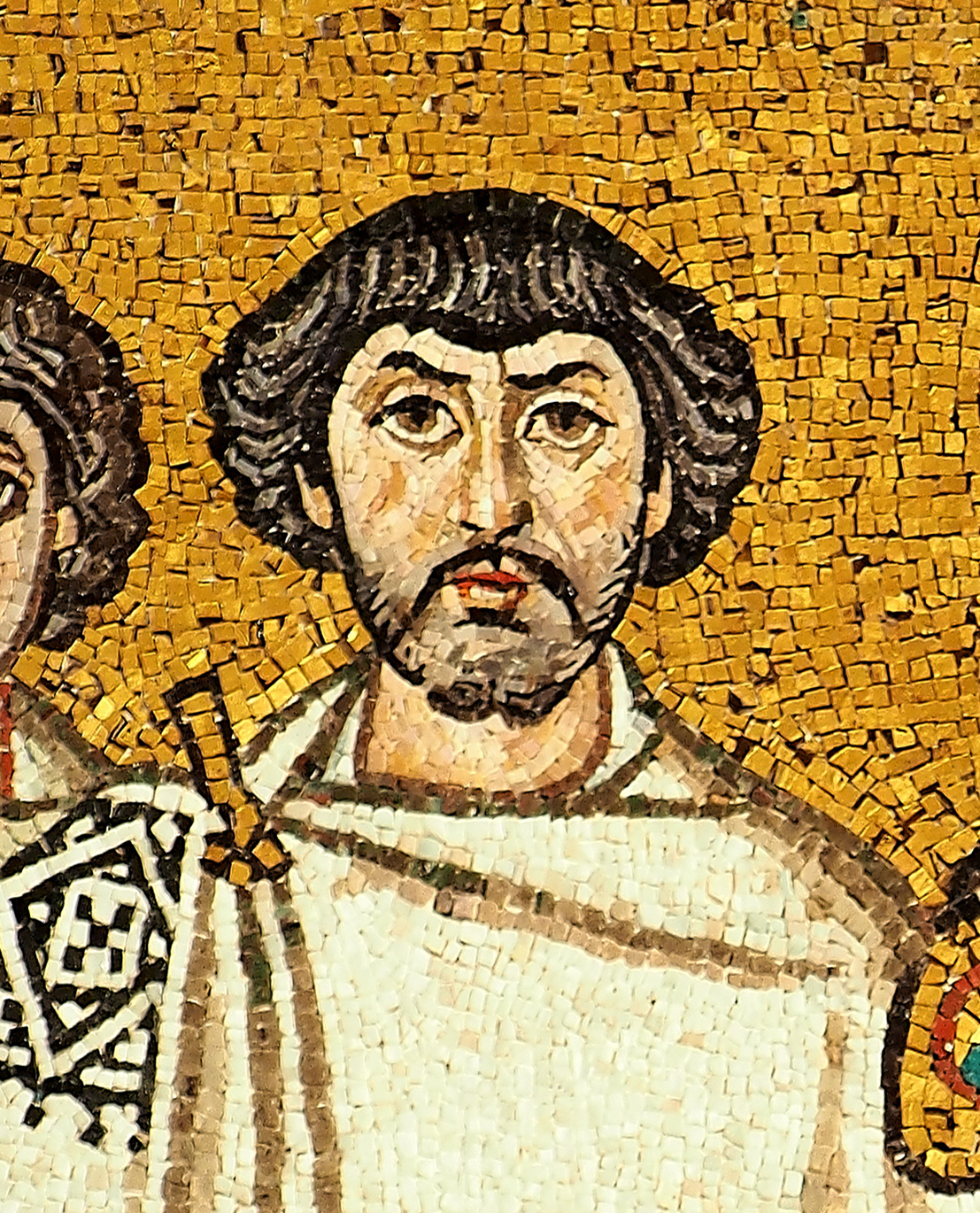
Emperor Justinian I (left) and his general Belisarius (right). Mosaics, 6th century, from the Basilica of San Vitale, Ravenna, Italy

The reign of Justinian I was a high point in east Roman history. Following his accession in 527, the legal code was rewritten as the Corpus Juris Civilis, which streamlined Roman law across the empire; he reasserted imperial control over religion and morality through purges of pagans, heretics, and other "deviants"; and having ruthlessly subdued the 532 Nika revolt he rebuilt much of Constantinople, including the Hagia Sophia. Justinian I took advantage of the confusion, following Theoderic the Ostrogoth's death, to attempt the reconquest of Italy. The Vandal Kingdom in North Africa was subjugated in late 533 by the general Belisarius, who then invaded Italy; the Ostrogothic Kingdom mostly ended in 554.

In the 540s, Justinian began to suffer reversals on multiple fronts. Capitalising on Constantinople's preoccupation with the West, Khosrow I of the Sasanian Empire invaded Byzantine territory and sacked Antioch in 540. A devastating plague killed a large proportion of the population and severely reduced the empire's social and financial stability. The most difficult period of the Ostrogothic war, against their king Totila, came during this decade; while divisions among Justinian's advisors undercut the administration's response. He also did not fully heal the divisions in Chalcedonian Christianity, as the fifth ecumenical council failed to make a real difference. Justinian died in 565; his reign was more successful than any other emperor, yet he left behind an unstable empire.

Justin II (r. 565–578) inherited an empire stretched thin both financially and territorially. He was soon at war on many fronts. Fearing the aggressive Avars, the Lombards conquered much of northern Italy by 572. The Sasanian wars restarted in the same year, and would not conclude until 591; by this time, the Avars and Slavs had repeatedly invaded the Balkans, causing great instability. Maurice campaigned extensively in the region during the 590s, and although he re-established Byzantine control up to the Danube, he pushed his troops too far in 602—they mutinied, proclaimed an officer named Phocas as emperor, and executed Maurice. The Sasanians seized their moment and reopened hostilities; Phocas was unable to cope and soon faced a major rebellion led by Heraclius. Phocas lost Constantinople in 610 and was executed; this destructive civil war accelerated the empire's decline.

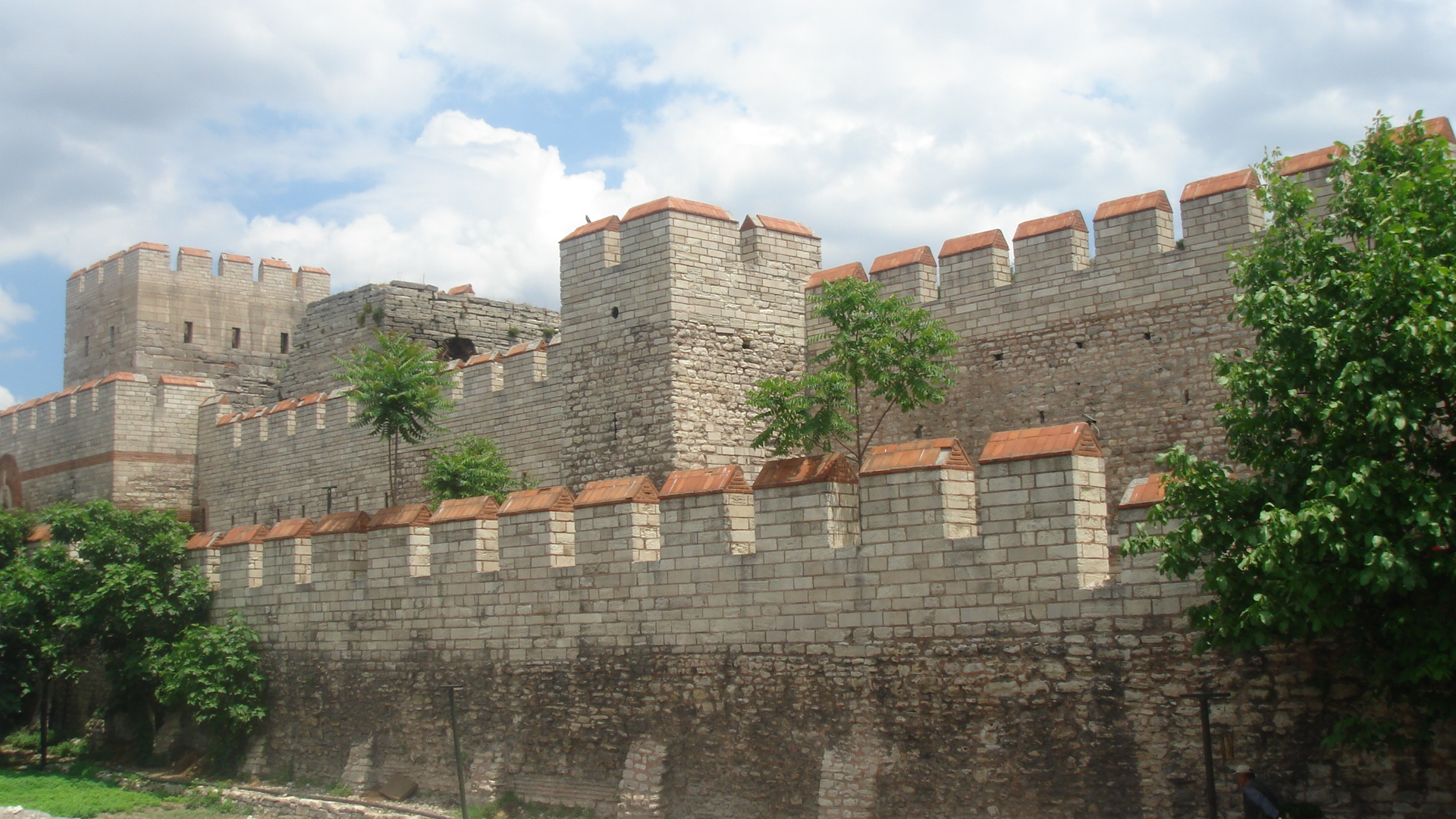
The Theodosian Walls of Constantinople, very important during the 717–718 siege

Under Khosrow II, the Sassanids occupied the Levant and Egypt and advanced into Asia Minor, and the Avars and Slavs raided in the Balkans. The Empire's control of Italy also weakened. After successfully repelling a siege of Constantinople in 626, Heraclius won a decisive victory at the Battle of Nineveh, eventually defeating the Sassanids later that year. The triumph would prove short-lived. The Arab conquests soon saw the conquest of the Levant, Egypt, and the Sassanid Empire by the newly formed Arab Rashidun Caliphate. By Heraclius' death in 641, the empire had been severely reduced economically and territorially—the loss of the wealthy eastern provinces had deprived the empire of as much as three-quarters of its revenue.

The next century is poorly documented. Arab raids into Asia Minor started quickly, and the Empire responded by holding fortified centres and avoiding battle wherever possible. Although Anatolia was invaded annually, it avoided permanent Arab occupation. The outbreak of the First Fitna in 656 gave the Empire breathing space, which it used sensibly: some order was restored in the Balkans by Constans II (r. 641–668) following his administrative reorganisation which over time evolved into the "theme system", a structure that allocated troops to defend specific provinces. Constantine IV (r. 668–685) repelled the Arab efforts to capture Constantinople in the 670s using Greek fire, but suffered a reversal against the Bulgars, who soon established an empire in the northern Balkans. Nevertheless, he had done enough to secure the empire's position, especially as the Umayyad Caliphate was undergoing another civil war.

Beginning in 695, when Constantine's son Justinian II was first deposed, the empire entered an era of political instability that lasted for the next 22 years. While Justinian had stabilised the situation with the divided Arabs, the threat of the reconstituted caliphate was met by Leo III when he repelled the 717–718 siege, the first serious challenge against Arab expansion.

=== 718–867: Isaurian, Nikephorian, and Amorian dynasties ===
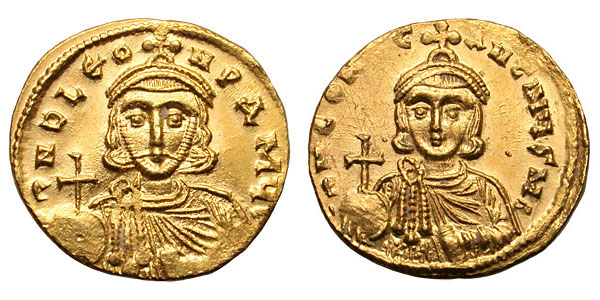
Gold solidus of Leo III (left) and his son and heir, Constantine V (right)

The emperors Leo III (r. 717–741) and Constantine V (r. 741–775) were effective leaders, both in government and warfare. They withstood continued Arab attacks, as well as civil war and natural disasters. Constantine's success reestablished the state as a major regional power. Leo's reign produced the Ekloge ton nomon, a code of law that evolved that of Justinian I. He also continued to reform the theme system in order to lead offensive campaigns against the Muslims, culminating in a notable victory in 740. Constantine overcame an early civil war against his brother-in-law Artabasdos, created stability against the new Abbasid Caliphate, campaigned successfully against the Bulgars, and continued to make administrative and military reforms. Both emperors supported iconoclast policies opposing the veneration of religious images, which had them later vilified by biased authors, creating issues that continue to impact modern scholarship; Constantine's reign also saw the loss of Ravenna to the Lombards, and the beginning of a split from the Roman papacy.

In 780, Empress Irene assumed power as regent for her son Constantine VI. Although she was a capable administrator who restored the veneration of icons, the empire was destabilised by her conflict with her son. The Bulgars and Abbasids inflicted numerous defeats on the Byzantine armies, and the papacy crowned Charlemagne as Roman emperor in 800. In 802, the unpopular Irene was overthrown by Nikephoros I; he reformed the empire's administration but died in battle against the Bulgars in 811. Military defeats and societal disorder, especially the resurgence of iconoclasm, characterised the next eighteen years.

The Byzantine Empire c. 814

Stability was somewhat restored during the reign of Theophilos (r. 829–842). He capitalised on economic growth to complete construction programmes, including rebuilding the sea walls of Constantinople, overhaul provincial governance, and wage inconclusive campaigns against the Abbasids. After his death, his empress Theodora, ruling on behalf of her son Michael III, permanently restored the veneration of icons; the empire prospered under their sometimes-fraught rule. Michael was posthumously vilified by historians loyal to the dynasty of his successor Basil I, who had him assassinated in 867 and later benefited from successes begun under his predecessor.

=== 867–1081: Macedonian and Doukas dynasties ===
Basil I (r. 867–886) continued Michael's policies. His armies campaigned with mixed results in Italy but defeated the Paulicians of Tephrike. His successor Leo VI (r. 886–912) (Note: Leo VI was officially the son of Basil I, but a persistent rumour alleged that he had been fathered by Michael III, who had previously taken Leo's mother Eudokia Ingerina as his mistress. One of Leo's first acts was to rebury Michael III in Basil's mausoleum in the Church of the Holy Apostles complex, which exacerbated the rumours.) sponsored, compiled, and issued a large body of written works. These included the Basilika, a Greek translation of Justinian I's legal corpus that incorporated Leo's new laws; the Tactica, a military treatise; and the Book of the Eparch, a manual on Constantinople's trading regulations. Outside these literary, legal, and administrative projects, Leo's reign was less successful: the empire was defeated by the Bulgarians and lost Taormina, its last outpost on Sicily. He also provoked theological scandal by marrying four times in an attempt to father a legitimate heir.

The early reign of this heir, Constantine VII, was tumultuous, as his mother Zoe, his uncle Alexander, the patriarch Nicholas, members of leading aristocratic families, and the powerful external pressure of Simeon I of Bulgaria shaped the struggle for power. In 920, the admiral Romanos I used his fleet to secure power, crowning himself and demoting Constantine to the position of junior co-emperor. His reign, marked by the end of the war against Bulgaria and successes in the east under the general John Kourkouas, ended in 944 when his sons deposed him; Constantine then removed them and ruled as sole emperor. Constantine's politically limited sole rule is often associated with the Macedonian Renaissance, but many of the works compiled at his court were also intended to legitimise and glorify the Macedonian dynasty. His son and successor died young; under two soldier-emperors, Nikephoros II (r. 963–969) and John I Tzimiskes (r. 969–976), the army claimed numerous military successes, including the conquest of Cilicia and Antioch, and a victory against Bulgaria and the Kievan Rus' in 971. John in particular was an effective soldier-emperor who introduced frontier military reforms and pursued successful fiscal and diplomatic policies.

Territorial extent of the Byzantine Empire at the time of Basil II's death in 1025

After John's death, Constantine VII's grandsons Basil II and Constantine VIII ruled jointly for half a century, although the latter exercised little real power. Their early reign was occupied by conflicts against two prominent generals, Bardas Skleros and Bardas Phokas, which ended in 989 after Phokas's death and Skleros's submission, and by a power struggle against the eunuch Basileios, who was dismissed in 985. Basil, who never married or had children, subsequently refused to delegate much authority: he took personal command of the army, sidelined established military families, and promoted officers loyal to him. His reign witnessed the decades-long campaign against Bulgaria, in which the Battle of Kleidion in 1014 proved decisive before the final Byzantine conquest in 1018. Diplomatic efforts, critical for this success, also contributed to the annexation of Caucasian territories in the 1020s and coexistence with the new Fatimid Caliphate. When he died in 1025, Basil's empire stretched from the Danube and southern Italy in the west to the Euphrates in the east; his rapid expansion was not matched by comparable administrative reforms.

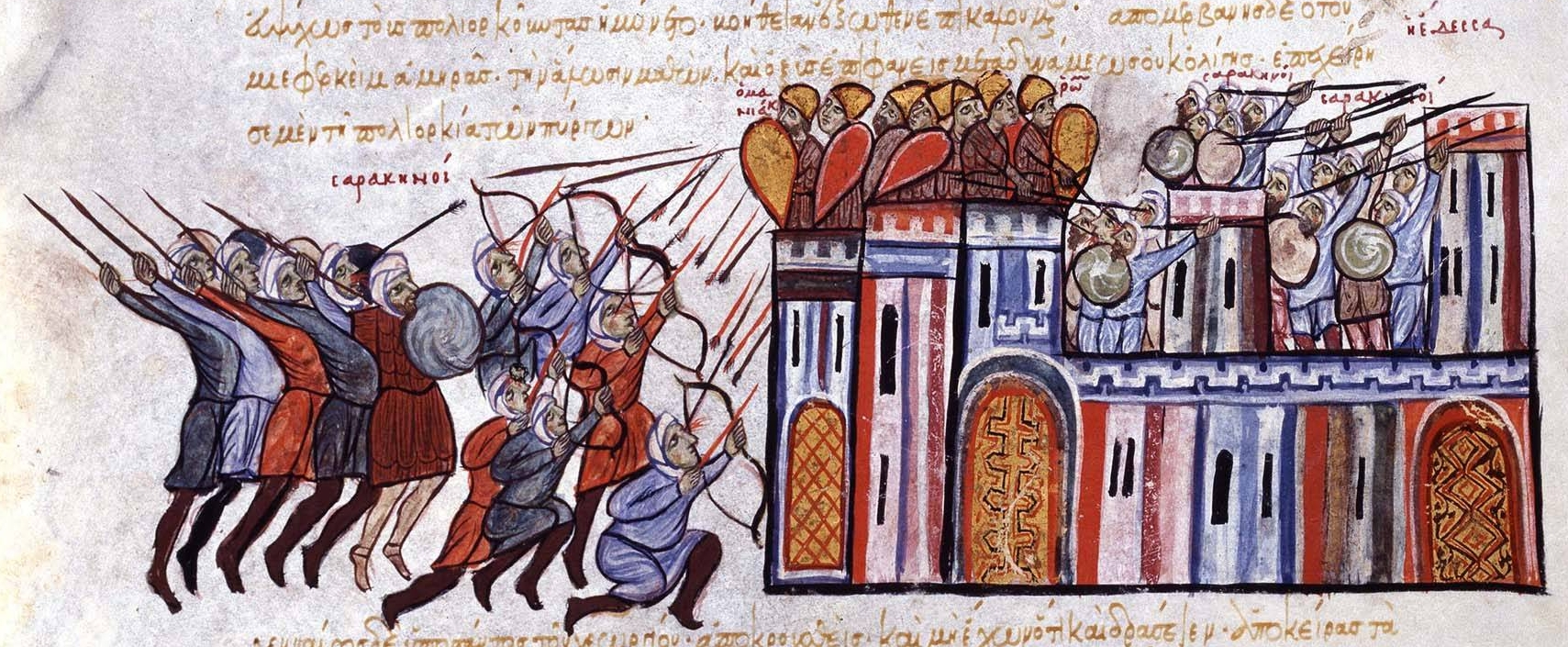
The seizure of Edessa (1031) by the Byzantines under George Maniakes and the counterattack by the Seljuk Turks

After Constantine VIII's death in 1028, his daughters, the empresses Zoe (r. 1028–1050) and Theodora (r. 1042–1056), held the keys to power: four emperors (Romanos III, Michael IV, Michael V, and Constantine IX) ruled only because of their connection to Zoe, while Michael VI (r. 1056–1057) was selected by Theodora. Political instability, budget deficits, expensive military failures, and problems connected to over-extension strained imperial finances, legitimacy, and frontier defence; the empire's strategic focus moved from maintaining hegemony to prioritising defence.

The empire soon came under sustained assault on three fronts, from the Seljuk Turks in the east, the Pecheneg nomads in the north, and the Normans in the west. The Byzantine army struggled to confront these enemies, whose raids, settlement patterns, and military organisation made them difficult to defeat through single set-piece battles. In 1071 Bari, the last remaining Byzantine settlement in Italy, was captured by the Normans, while the Seljuks won a decisive victory at the Battle of Manzikert, taking the emperor Romanos IV Diogenes prisoner. Romanos's capture and the political struggle that followed helped trigger a decade of civil conflict, during which Turkish forces overran much of Anatolia up to the Sea of Marmara.

=== 1081–1204: Komnenos and Angelos dynasties ===
One prominent general, Alexios I, usurped the throne in 1081. In contrast to the prior turmoil, the three reigns of Alexios (r. 1081–1118), his son John II (r. 1118–1143), and his grandson Manuel I (r. 1143–1180) lasted almost a century and restored the empire's regional authority for the final time. Alexios immediately faced the Normans under Robert Guiscard and repelled them through warfare and diplomacy. He then targeted the Pechenegs and decisively defeated them in 1091 with help from the Cumans; a separate Cuman incursion followed in 1094. Finally, looking to recover Asia Minor from the Seljuks, he approached Pope Urban II for help c. 1095. The scale and aims of western Christendom's response exceeded Byzantine expectations: the First Crusade helped restore parts of western Anatolia to Byzantine control, although Alexios and its leaders soon fell out. The rest of his reign was spent dealing with the Normans and Seljuks, establishing a new, loyal aristocracy to ensure stability, and carrying out fiscal and ecclesiastical reforms.

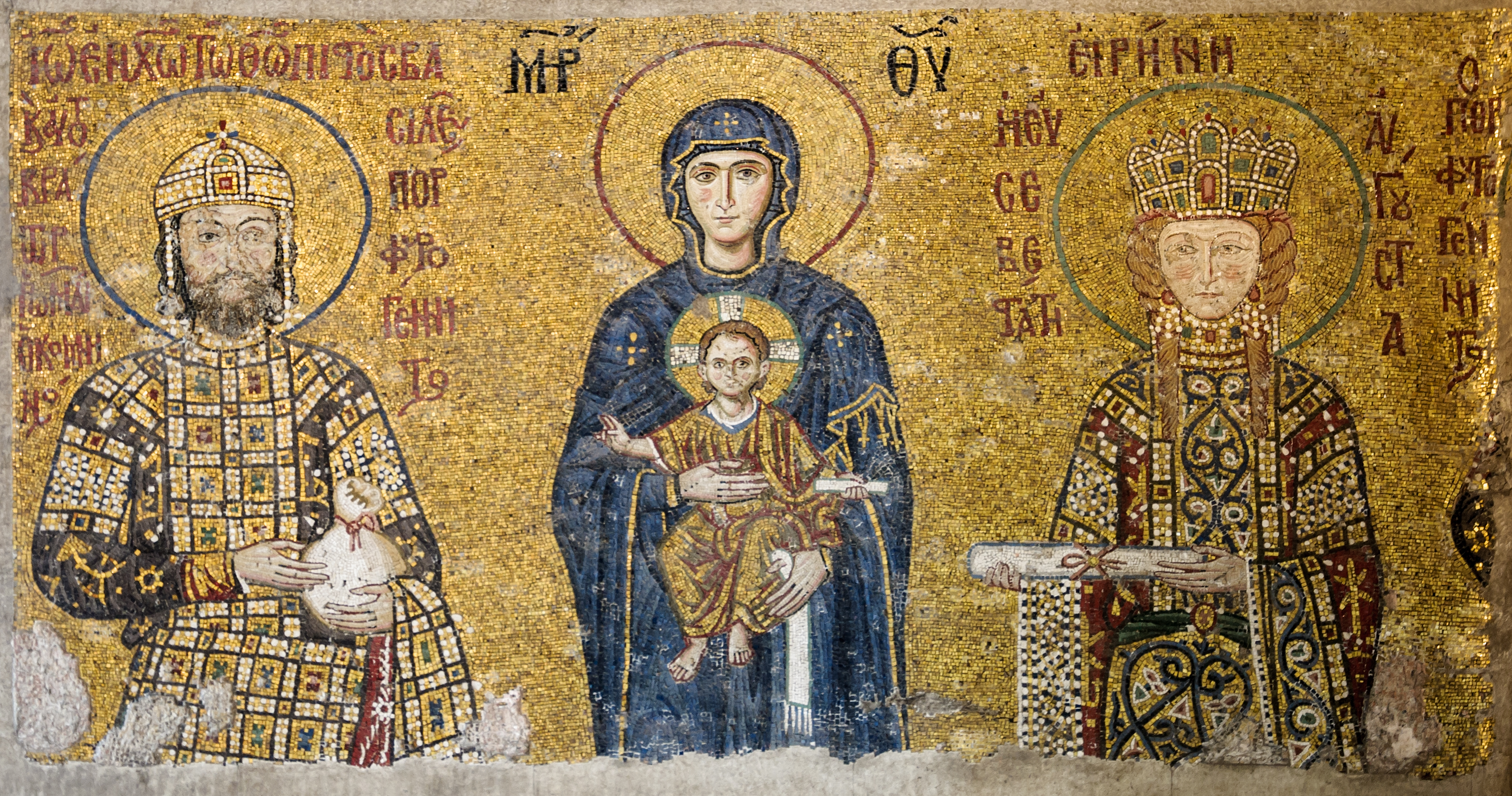
A mosaic from the Hagia Sophia of Constantinople (modern Istanbul), depicting Mary and Jesus, flanked by John II Komnenos (left) and his wife Irene of Hungary (right), 12th century

Alexios' concentration of power in the hands of his Komnenos dynasty meant the most serious political threats came from within the imperial family—before his coronation, John II had to overcome his mother Irene and his sister Anna, and the primary threat during his reign was his brother Isaac. John campaigned annually and extensively—he fought the Pechenegs in 1122, the Hungarians in the late 1120s, and the Seljuks throughout his reign, waging large campaigns in Syria in his final years—but he did not achieve large territorial gains. In 1138, John raised the imperial standard over the Crusader Principality of Antioch to intimidate the city into allying with the Byzantines, but did not attack, fearing that it would provoke western Christendom to respond.

Manuel I used the considerable financial resources left by his father in pursuit of his ambitions, and also to secure the empire's position in an increasingly multilateral geopolitical landscape. Through a combination of diplomacy and subsidies, he cultivated a network of allies and client rulers around the empire: the Turks of the Sultanate of Rum, the Kingdom of Hungary, the Cilician Armenians, Balkan princes, Italian and Dalmatian cities, and most importantly Antioch and the Crusader States, marrying one of their princesses in 1161. Manuel managed the difficult passage of the Second Crusade through Byzantine territories in 1147, but the campaign's failure was blamed on the Byzantines by western contemporaries. He was less successful militarily: an invasion of Sicily was decisively defeated by King William I in 1156, leading to tensions with Frederick Barbarossa, the Holy Roman Emperor; two decades later, an invasion of Anatolia was defeated at the Battle of Myriokephalon.

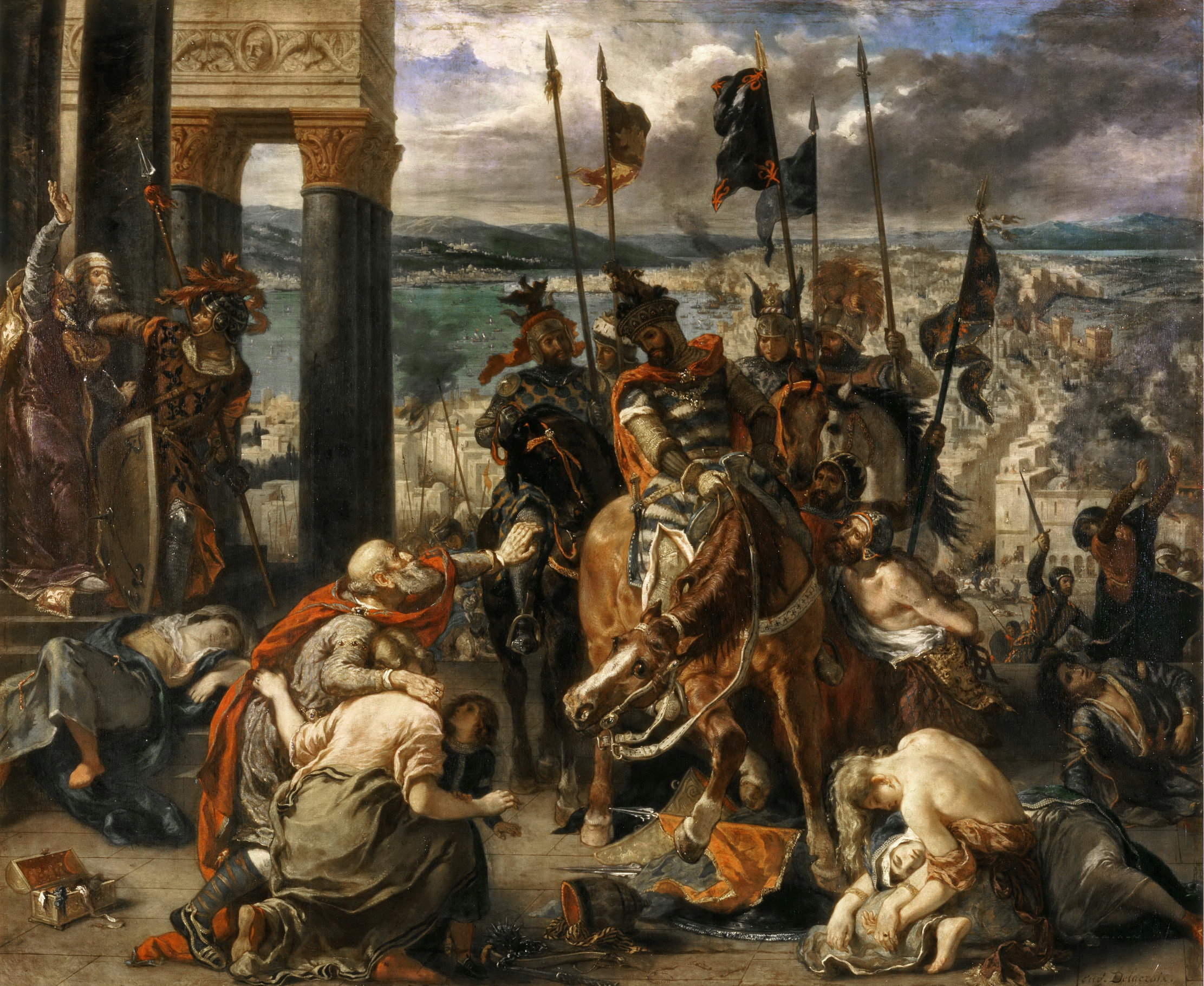
The Entry of the Crusaders into Constantinople, by Eugène Delacroix (1840)

Manuel's death exposed the fragility of the political system and the empire soon came under intense pressure. His son Alexios II was too young to rule, and his troubled regency was overthrown by his uncle Andronikos I Komnenos; he was replaced by Isaac II in 1185. The empire lost ground on several frontiers as ambitious rulers seized their chance: Hungary and the Turks captured Byzantine territories, an exiled Komnenian prince seized Cyprus; and most injuriously, a revolt in 1185 caused the foundation of a resurrected Bulgarian state. Relations with the West deteriorated further after Constantinople sought an understanding with Saladin and obstructed the overland army of Frederick Barbarossa during the Third Crusade. In 1195, Isaac II was deposed by his brother Alexios III; this dynastic quarrel helped make the Fourth Crusade's intervention in Constantinople possible.

The Fourth Crusade was originally intended to target Egypt, but amid strategic difficulties, Isaac II's son Alexios Angelos convinced the crusaders to restore his father to the throne in exchange for a huge tribute. They attacked Constantinople in 1203, reinstating Isaac II and his son to the throne. The new rulers swiftly grew unpopular and were deposed by Alexios V, an event used by the crusaders as a pretext to sack the city in April 1204, ransacking the accumulated wealth of Constantinople.

=== 1204–1453: Palaiologos dynasty ===
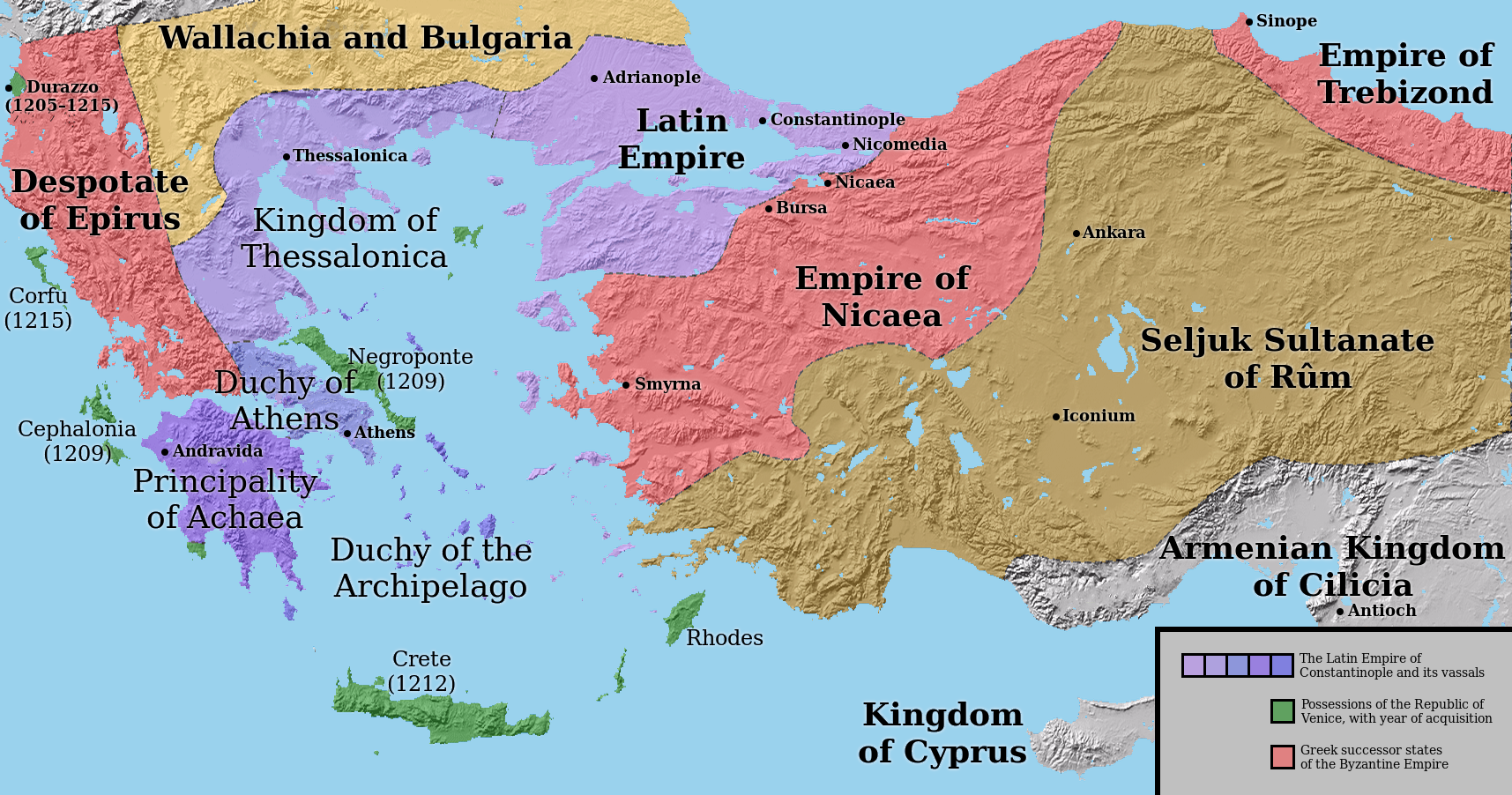
The partition of the empire following the Fourth Crusade, c. 1204

Byzantine territories fragmented into competing political entities. The crusaders crowned Baldwin I as the ruler of a new Latin Empire in Constantinople; it soon suffered a crushing defeat against the Bulgarians in 1205. It also failed to expand west or east, where three successor states had formed: the Empire of Nicaea and the Empire of Trebizond in Asia Minor, and the Despotate of Epirus on the Adriatic. The Venetians acquired many ports and islands, and the Principality of Achaea emerged in southern Greece. Trebizond lost the key port of Sinope in 1214 and thereafter played little role away from the southeastern Black Sea. For a time, Epirus appeared well placed to reclaim Constantinople from the Latins, and its ruler Theodore Doukas crowned himself emperor, but he suffered a critical defeat at the Battle of Klokotnitsa in 1230, and Epirote power waned.

Nicaea, ruled by the Laskarid dynasty and drawing on both Byzantine refugees and local populations, blocked the Latins and the Seljuks of Rum from expanding east and west respectively. John III (r. 1221–1254) strengthened Nicaea militarily, economically, and diplomatically. He discouraged imports and promoted local production, and he made many diplomatic treaties, especially after Mongol armies ravaged Bulgaria and defeated Rum between 1237 and 1243. This chaos was an opportunity for John, and he fought many successful campaigns against the states disrupted by the Mongol invasions. Soon after his death, his grandson was usurped by Michael VIII, founder of the Palaiologos dynasty, who recaptured Constantinople in 1261.

Michael desired to restore the empire's glory through a rebuilding programme in Constantinople, clever diplomatic alliances, and expansionist wars in Europe. He staved off the threatening Charles I of Anjou first by recognising papal primacy and certain Catholic doctrines at the 1274 Second Council of Lyon, and then by aiding the Sicilian Vespers against Charles in 1282. However, his religious concessions were despised by most of the populace, and were repudiated by his successor Andronikos II (r. 1282–1328). He and his grandson Andronikos III (r. 1328–1341) led several campaigns to restore imperial influence, succeeding in Epirus and Thessaly. Their policies also weakened the state, including the dismissal of the fleet in 1285, the hiring of the mercenary Catalan Company, which turned on the Byzantines in the 1300s, and their civil war between 1320 and 1328. A disastrous civil war between 1341 and 1354 caused long-term economic difficulties, while the Ottoman Turks gradually expanded.

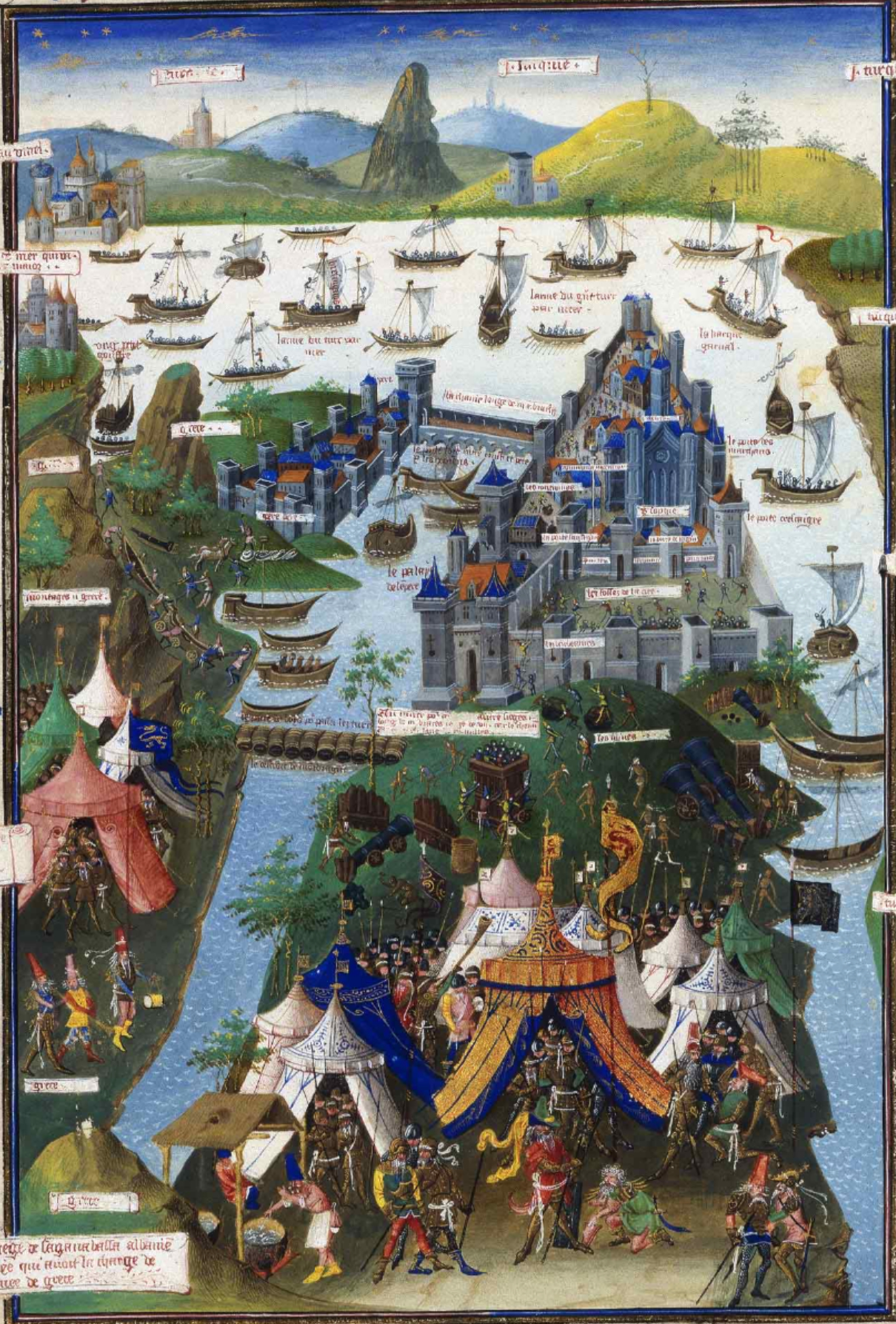
The siege of Constantinople in 1453, depicted in a 15th-century French miniature

The diminished Byzantine state survived for another century through diplomacy and favourable external developments. The Ottomans gradually subjugated Anatolia and simultaneously expanded into Europe from 1354, taking Philippopolis in 1363, Adrianopolis in 1369, and Thessalonica in 1387. Dynastic struggles increasingly depended on Venetian, Genoese, and Ottoman backing. After Manuel II (r. 1391–1425) refused to pay homage to Sultan Bayezid I in 1394, Constantinople was besieged until the rampaging warlord Timur decisively defeated Bayezid in 1402, with the city perilously close to surrender.

After Ankara, Manuel II gained nearly two decades of relative peace as Ottoman succession struggles and later Anatolian campaigns occupied the sultans. In 1421, his unsuccessful backing of the claimant Mustafa Çelebi led to a renewed Ottoman assault. Although John VIII (r. 1425–1448) reconciled with the Catholic West at the Council of Florence, his empire steadily diminished. In 1452, Sultan Mehmed II resolved to capture Constantinople, and laid siege early the following year. On 29 May 1453, the city was captured, the last emperor, Constantine XI, died in battle, and the Byzantine Empire ended.

== Structures of the state ==
The themes of Asia Minor, c. 750

The themes of Asia Minor, c. 950

=== Governance ===
Diocletian and Constantine's 4th-century reforms reorganised the empire's provinces into overarching Dioceses and then into Praetorian prefectures, separating the army from the civil administration. The central government, led by the emperor from the time of the earlier Pax Romana and into the late Palaiologan era, typically focused on the military, foreign relations, administering the law, and collecting taxes. A person usually ascended into the position of emperor after a ceremony. The senate evolved into a ceremonial body within the imperial court.

Cities had been a collection of self-governing communities with central government and church representatives from the 5th century. However, constant warfare significantly altered this, as regular raids and ongoing conflict led to power centralising due to the empire's fight for survival. After the 7th century, the prefectures were abandoned, and in the 9th century, the provinces were divided into administrative units called themes (or themata), governed solely by a military commander (strategos).

=== Law ===
Theodosius II (r. 408–450) formalised Roman law by appointing five jurists as principal authorities and compiling legislation issued since Constantine's reign into the Codex Theodosianus. This process culminated in the Corpus Juris Civilis under Justinian I (r. 527–565), who commissioned a complete standardisation of imperial decrees since Hadrian's time and resolved conflicting legal opinions of the jurists. The result became the definitive legal authority. This body of law covered civil matters and also public law, including imperial power and administrative organisation. After 534, Justinian issued the Novellae (New Laws) in Greek, which marked a transition from Roman to Byzantine law. Legal historian Bernard Stolte distinguishes Roman law as this because Western Europe inherited law through the Latin texts of the Corpus Juris Civilis only.

Zachary Chitwood argues that the Corpus Juris Civilis was largely inaccessible in Latin, particularly in the provinces. Following the 7th-century Arab conquests, people began questioning the development and application of law, leading to stronger ties between law and Christianity. This context influenced Leo III (r. 717–741) to develop the Ekloge ton nomon, which placed an emphasis on humanity. The Ekloge inspired practical legal texts like the Farmers' Law, Seamen's Law, and Soldiers' Law, which Chitwood suggests were used daily in the provinces as companions to the Corpus Juris Civilis. During the Macedonian dynasty, efforts to reform law began with the publication of the Procheiron and the Eisagoge, which aimed to define the emperor's power under prevailing laws, and to replace the Ekloge due to its association with iconoclasm. Leo VI (r. 886–912) completed a complete codification of Roman law in Greek through the Basilika, a work of 60 books which became the foundation of Byzantine law. In 1345, Constantine Harmenopoulos compiled the Hexabiblos, a six-volume law book derived from various Byzantine legal sources.

=== Christianity and the Church ===
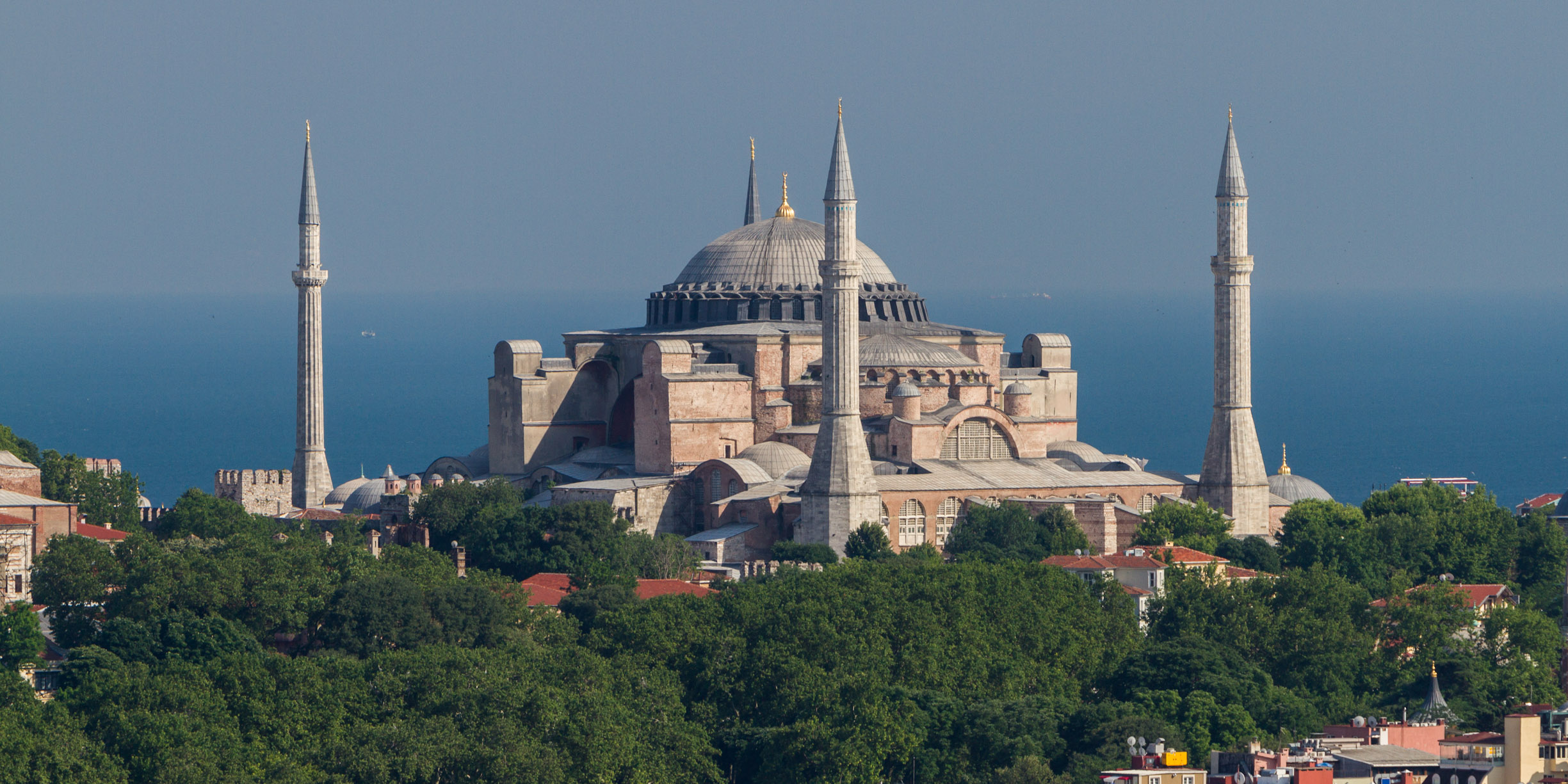
The Hagia Sophia in Constantinople (now Istanbul) was built by the Eastern Roman emperor Justinian the Great in 532–537.

Christianity, bolstered by Constantine's support, began shaping all aspects of life in the early Byzantine Empire. Despite the transition, the historian Anthony Kaldellis views Christianity as "bringing no economic, social, or political changes to the state other than being more deeply integrated into it". When the Roman state in the West collapsed politically, cultural differences began to divide the Christian churches of the East and West. Internal disputes within the Eastern churches led to the migration of monastic communities to Rome, exacerbating tensions between Rome and Constantinople. These disputes, (Note: Arianism, one of the first major controversies, shook the empire until it was addressed by the Nicene Creed. Other controversies persisted, leading to schisms, such as debates on the fundamental definitions of Christ's nature at the Council of Chalcedon in 451.) particularly in Egypt and the eastern Mediterranean, eventually split the church into three branches: Chalcedonian, Monophysite (Coptic), and Nestorian. The Chalcedonian group maintained dominance within the empire's territories, while the Monophysite and Nestorian branches largely fell under Muslim rule in the 7th century.

Eastern patriarchs frequently sought the Papacy's mediation in doctrinal and practical matters, but the pope's authority was not universally acknowledged, even in nearby regions like Northern Italy. By 600, the Slavic settlement of the Balkans disrupted communication between Rome and Constantinople, further widening the divide. The Arab and Lombard invasions, and the increased Frankish presence, deepened this estrangement and intensified disputes over jurisdiction and authority between the two spiritual centres. Differences in ritual and theology, such as the use of unleavened bread and the Filioque clause, as well as divergences in ecclesiology—plenitudo potestatis versus the authority of Ecumenical Councils—and issues of mutual respect, contributed to the separation of Western Christianity from Eastern Christianity. This separation began by 597 and culminated in 1054 during the East–West Schism.

== Warfare ==
=== Military evolution ===
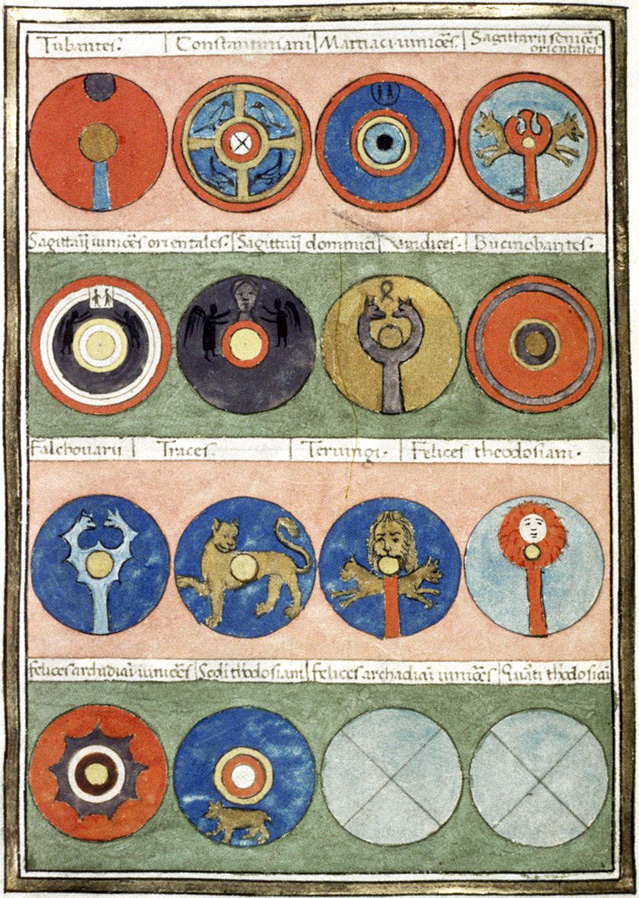
Shield insignia of regiments under the command of the Magister Militum Praesentalis II of the East Roman army c. 395 AD. Page from the Notitia Dignitatum.

In the late 6th century, following Justinian I's wars, seven mobile field armies called comitatenses, numbering around 150,000 troops, were deployed around the empire; they remained the finest armies in Europe. They were aided by twenty-five frontier garrisons of approximately 195,000 lower-quality limitanei troops. Additional troops included subsidised allied forces and imperial guard units like the Scholae Palatinae. Naval forces were limited: flotillas were based at key locations, while 30,000 oarsmen were assembled to row 500, mostly requisitioned, transports to support the Vandalic War in Africa in 533.

The losses suffered in the 7th-century Arab conquests led to fundamental changes. The field armies were withdrawn into the core Anatolian territories and assigned to settle in specific districts, which became known as themata and eventually replaced the old provinces. The thematic armies, supported by the proceeds of their districts, came to resemble a provincial militia with a small professional core, aided by foreign mercenaries and imperial regiments at Constantinople. To defend against its new Muslim enemy, the navy was similarly reorganised into several provincialised fleets. It became the dominant power in the eastern Mediterranean, with dromons equipped with Greek fire proving crucial on several occasions.

As the 8th-century empire stabilised, the thematic militias proved rebellious and only suitable for defensive operations. The professional tagmata regiments, first introduced in the mid-700s and consisting of native Byzantine units alongside foreign forces such as the Varangian Guard, had completely replaced them by the 11th century. The mobile tagmata, suitable for offensive warfare, evolved new tactical and strategic structures; the late 10th-century army, perhaps the highest-quality force the empire produced, numbered approximately 140,000, up from below 100,000 in the late 700s. However, its defensive capacities were neglected, especially during the 11th-century civil wars, leading to the loss of Anatolia to the Seljuks. The navy had also been reduced, as the empire increasingly relied on potentially hostile powers such as Venice.

Post-1081 reforms re-established an effective army; the institution of feudal-like pronoia grants provided revenue to individuals in exchange for soldiers. The new army heavily relied on foreign mercenaries alongside indigenous Byzantine troops, but the financial demands of a standing army proved too much for the Byzantine state, which succumbed to the Fourth Crusade in 1204. The army of the Palaiologan dynasty, which retook Constantinople in 1261, was generally composed of a similar mix of mercenaries and indigenous troops, but it had lost all offensive capability by the late 1200s. The empire's continued survival depended on foreign armies; attempts in the 1340s to rebuild the fleet, unwisely disbanded in 1284, were forcibly halted by Genoa. No post-1204 Byzantine field army fielded more than 5,000 troops, and less than 8,000 defended the final siege of Constantinople in 1453.

=== Diplomacy ===
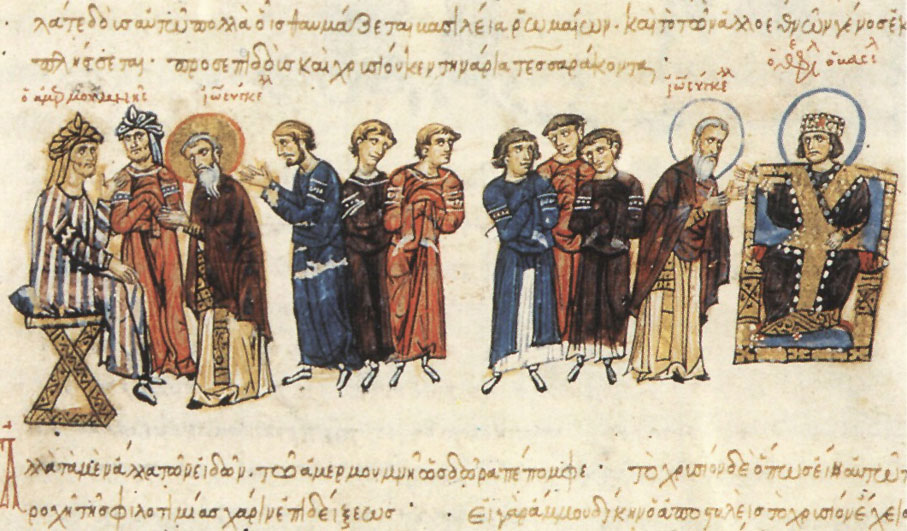
The embassy of John the Grammarian in 829, sent by emperor Theophilos to the Abbasid caliph Al-Ma'mun

Byzantine strategy was primarily defensive, aside from the brief period of aggression between the ninth and eleventh centuries, because of the empire's habitual lack of resources. To avoid risky and expensive military campaigns, the Byzantines engaged in extensive diplomatic efforts. These took various forms, including: formal embassies, client management, alliance or peace negotiations, political marriages, propaganda and bribery, or even espionage and assassination.

Defensively oriented Byzantine diplomacy was intended to protect the oikoumenē, the civilised Christian world which the empire rightfully ruled. The decline of the key limitrophe system, wherein client states along the borders served as intermediaries between the empire and other large enemies, exposed the empire to attack. By the eleventh century, Byzantine diplomacy was more bilateral and balanced. Although it lost some important advantages post-1204, diplomacy, including the still-influential Orthodox church, was nevertheless a central element in the empire's lengthy survival until 1453.

== Society ==
=== Demography ===
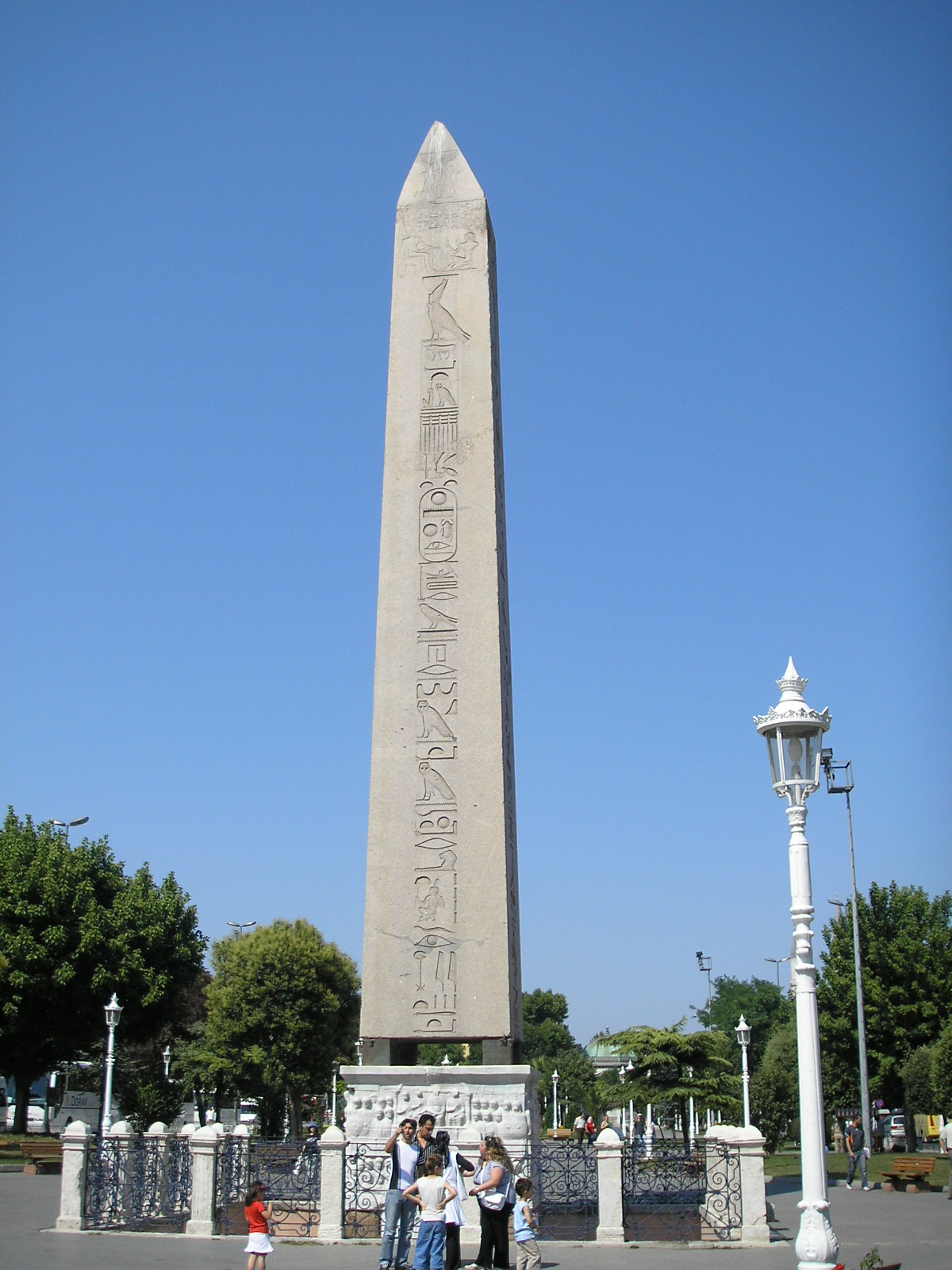
The Obelisk of Theodosius, an ancient Egyptian obelisk dedicated to the Egyptian King Thutmose III, was re-erected in the Hippodrome of Constantinople by the Roman emperor Theodosius I in the 4th century AD.

Scholars associate the Roman, Hellenic, and Christian imperial identities with the general population, but there is ongoing debate about how these and other regional identities blended together.

As many as 27 million people lived in the empire at its peak in 540, but this fell to 12 million by 800. Although plague and territorial losses to Arab Muslim invaders weakened the empire, it eventually recovered and by the near end of the Macedonian dynasty in 1025, the population is estimated to have been as high as 18 million. A few decades after the recapture of Constantinople in 1282, the empire's population was in the range of 3–5 million; by 1312, the number had dropped to 2 million. By the time the Ottoman Turks captured Constantinople, there were only 50,000 people in the city, one-tenth of its population in its prime.

Slavery remained legal but declined in economic importance as many former slave roles became free professions and the state increasingly promoted intermediate forms of dependency such as the coloni. From the 4th century, imperial legislation progressively limited owners' powers and restricted the enslavement of children, prisoners of war, and eventually Christians.

=== Cuisine and dining ===
Feasting was central to the culture. By the 10th century, dining shifted from reclining to tables with clean linen. The introduction of the fork and salad dressing (with oil and vinegar) further shaped Italian and Western traditions. Classical Greco-Roman era foods were common such as the condiment garos (similar to fermented fish sauces today) as well as the still popular baklava. Fruits like aubergine and orange, unknown during classical times, were added to diets. Foods that have continued into the modern era include the cured meat paston, Feta cheese, salt roe similar to the modern boutargue, Black sea caviar, tiropita, dolmades, and the soup trachanas. There were famed medieval sweet wines such as the Malvasia from Monemvasia, the Commandaria, and the eponymous Rumney wine which were drunk, as were millet beer (known as boza) and retsina.

=== Recreation ===
A game of τάβλι (tabula) played by the Byzantine emperor Zeno in 480 and recorded by Agathias in c. 530 because of a very unlucky dice throw for Zeno (red)

Chariot races were held from the early era until 1204, becoming one of the world's longest continuous sporting events. Mimes, the pantomime and some wild animal shows were prominent until the 6th century. Because Christian bishops and pagan philosophers did not like these activities, the state's funding for them ceased, leading to their decline and a move to private entertainment and sporting. A Persian version of polo introduced by the Crusaders called Tzykanion was played by the nobility and urban aristocracy in major cities during the middle and late eras, as was the sport of jousting introduced from the West. Over time, game boards like tavli became increasingly popular.

=== Language ===
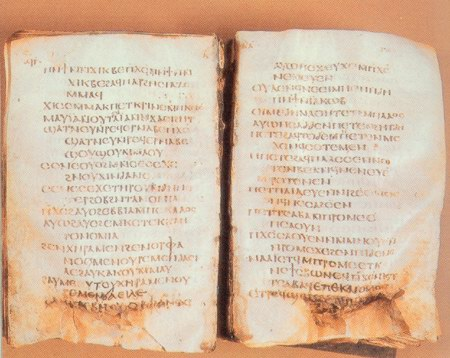
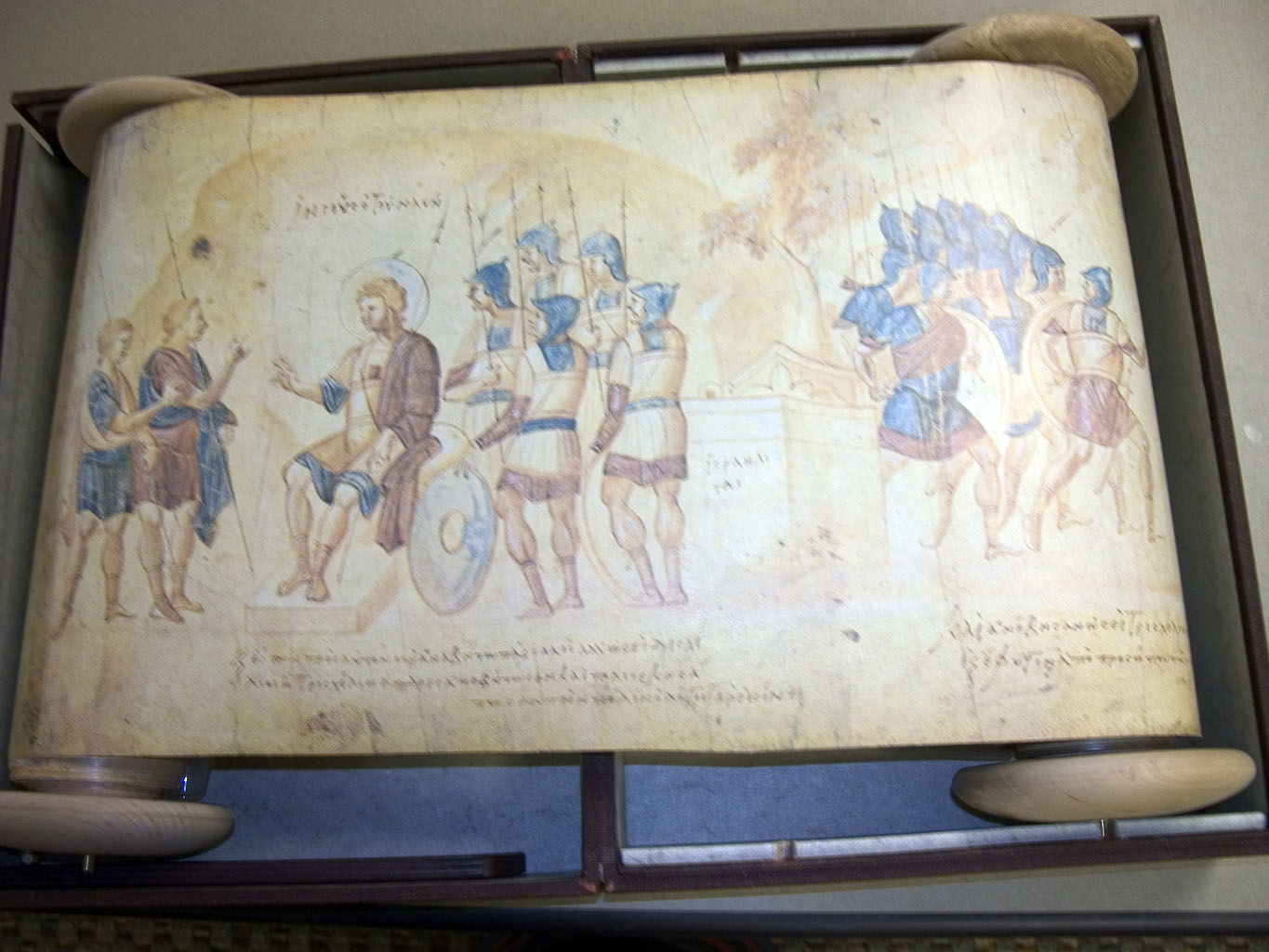
Left: The Mudil Psalter, the oldest complete psalter in the Coptic language (Coptic Museum, Egypt, Coptic Cairo).
Right: The Joshua Roll, a 10th-century illuminated Greek manuscript possibly made in Constantinople (Vatican Library, Rome).

Latin and Greek were the primary languages of the late Roman Empire, with the former prevalent in the west and the latter in the east. Although Latin was historically important in the military, legal system, and government, its use declined in Byzantine territories from 400 AD. Greek had begun to replace it even in those functions by the time of Justinian I (r. 527–565), who may have tried to arrest Latin's decline. Its extinction in the east was thereafter inevitable. A similar process of linguistic Hellenization occurred in Asia Minor, whose inhabitants had mostly abandoned their indigenous languages for Greek by early Byzantine times. Still, much of the population of the early empire would have known neither Latin nor Greek, especially in rural areas—their languages included Armenian in Byzantine Armenia, Aramaic dialects such as Syriac in Mesopotamia and the Levant, Coptic in Egypt, Phoenician on the Levant coast and in Carthage, and Berber in rural North Africa.

By the mid-6th century, Geoffrey Horrocks estimates that Greek was the native language of about one-third of the population, while it was spoken by 80% of the aristocracy. The empire lost its linguistic diversity in the wars of the 7th and 8th centuries, becoming overwhelmingly Greek-speaking. During this troubled period, classical Attic Greek—one of the linguistic registers the Byzantine Greeks inherited—fell out of use, while the everyday vernacular registers were still used. As the empire gained some stability from the 9th century onwards, and especially after the Komnenian restoration, Attic Greek came back into fashion for written works. In a phenomenon called diglossia, the gap between vernacular spoken Greek, which was rarely written in published works, and literary registers only spoken in formal contexts, became very wide.

During the Palaiologan period, although classically written works remained the normal style, Western-inspired writers began to use more vernacular elements, especially for romances or near-contemporary histories. One example is the Chronicle of the Morea, probably written by a French immigrant who was ignorant of formal Greek literature and who incorporated spoken Greek into his work. All such written vernacular was in verse form, becoming the ancestor of modern Greek poetry, while prose remained classically written.

== Economy ==
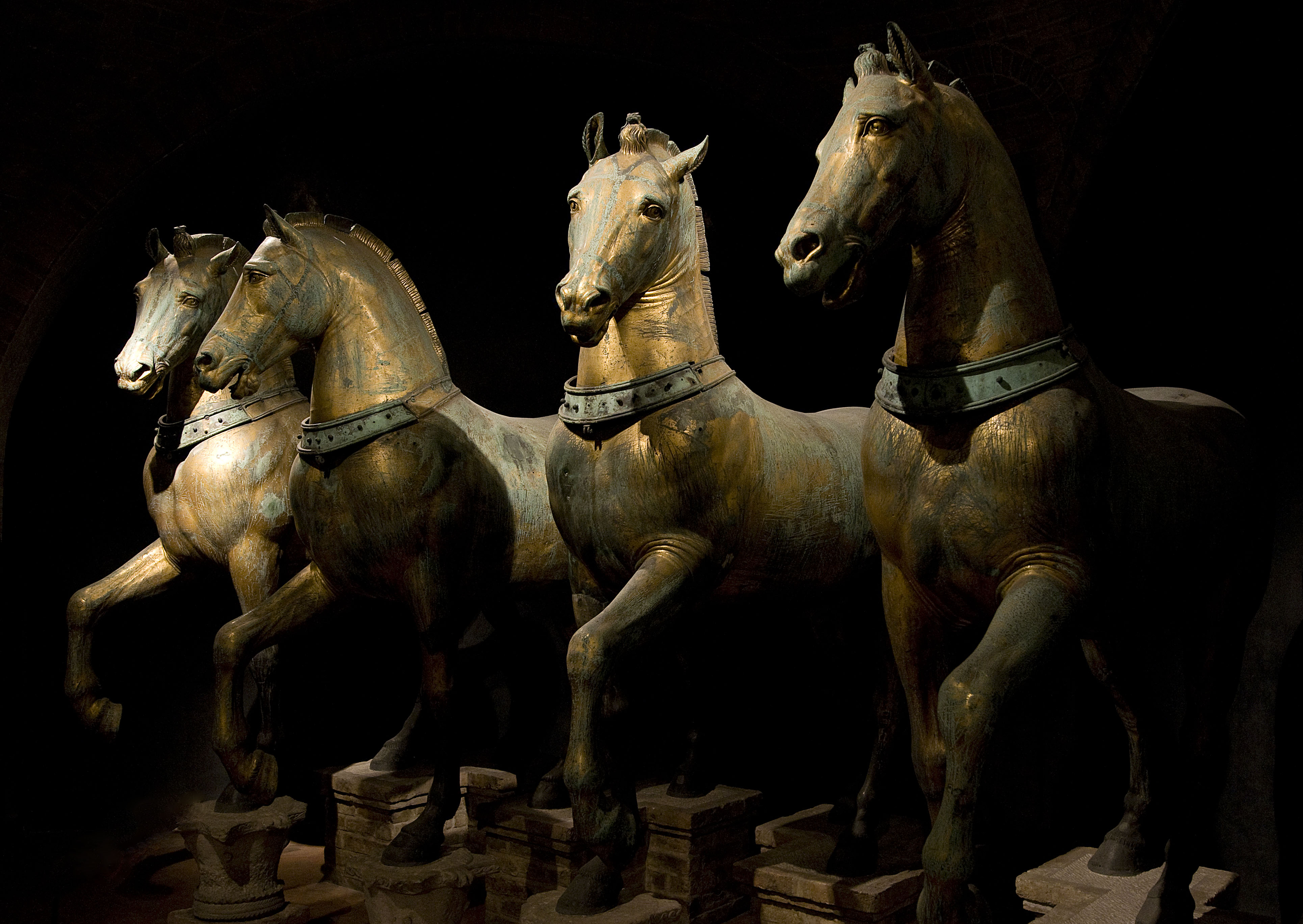
The four bronze horses that were once in the Hippodrome of Constantinople are today put on display in Venice.

The empire's geographic and maritime advantages reduced the costs of transporting goods and facilitated trade, making it a key driver of economic growth from antiquity and through the post-classical period. Infrastructure, including roads, public buildings, and the legal system, supported trade and other economic activities. Regions like Asia Minor, the Aegean islands, Egypt, the Levant, and Africa thrived as mature economic centres despite political challenges and military insecurities. From the mid-6th century onward, plagues, invasions, and wars caused populations and economies to decline, leading to the collapse of the ancient economy. Major cities like Constantinople, Antioch, Alexandria, and Thessaloniki continued to support substantial populations exceeding 100,000, while the countryside transitioned into fortified settlements. These rural areas developed into hamlets and villages, reflecting an economic shift between historical periods towards more efficient land use.

Low population density prompted emperors to encourage migration and resettlement, stimulating agriculture and demographic growth. By the 9th century, the economy began to revive, marked by increased agricultural production and urban expansion. Advances in science, technical knowledge, and literacy gave the empire a competitive edge over its neighbours. The 11th and 12th centuries witnessed consistent and rapid population growth, marking the peak of this revival. Italian merchants, particularly the Venetians, Genoese, and Pisans, took control of international trade, thus reducing the influence of native merchants. The political system grew increasingly extractive and authoritarian, contributing to the empire's collapse in 1204.

The fall of Constantinople during the Fourth Crusade in 1204 destroyed centuries of its wealth. Large landholdings were confiscated, and the empire fragmented into smaller rump states ruled by competing factions, making governance inefficient and increasing the costs of doing business. The state gradually lost control over trade practices, price regulations, the outflow of precious metals, and possibly even the minting of coins. Italian merchants further dominated trade as the events of 1204 opened the Black Sea to Western merchants, permanently altering the empire's fortunes. Farmers and manufacturers increasingly produced goods for local use and were affected by the insecurity of constant warfare. Despite these challenges, the empire's mixed economy (characterised by state interventions, public works, and market liberalisation) remained a model of medieval economic adaptability, even as it deteriorated under external pressures.

== Arts and sciences ==
=== Art and architecture ===
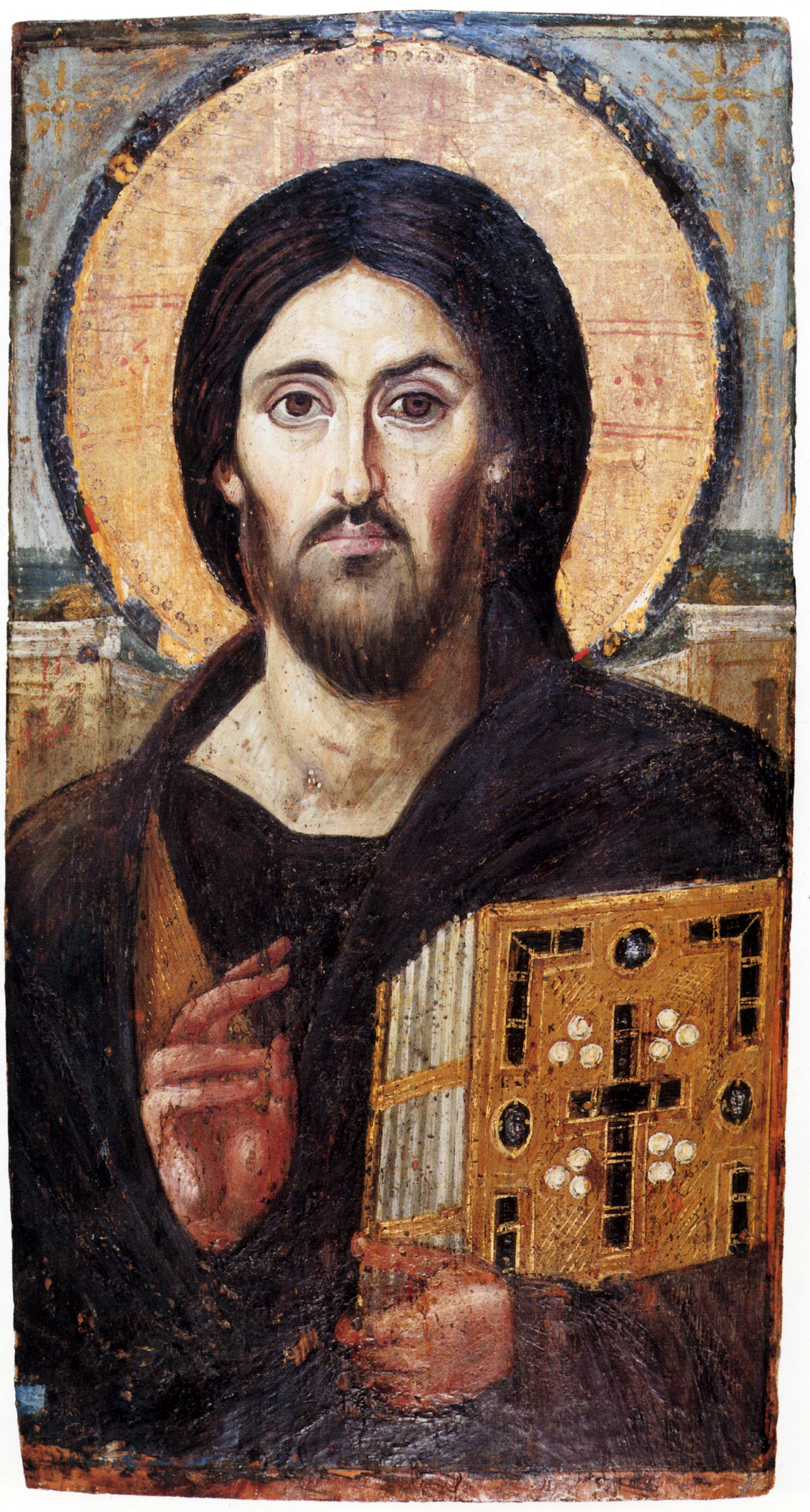
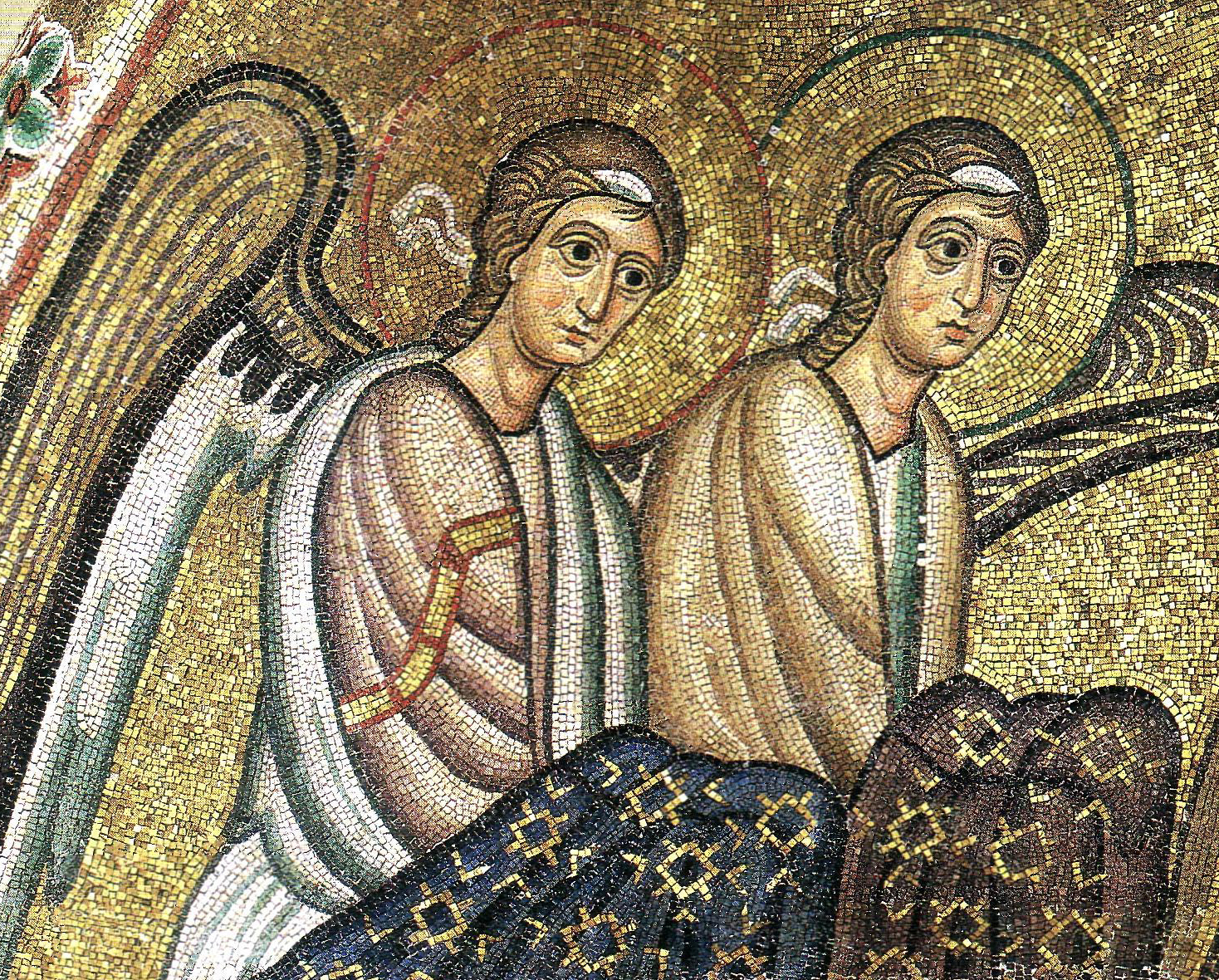
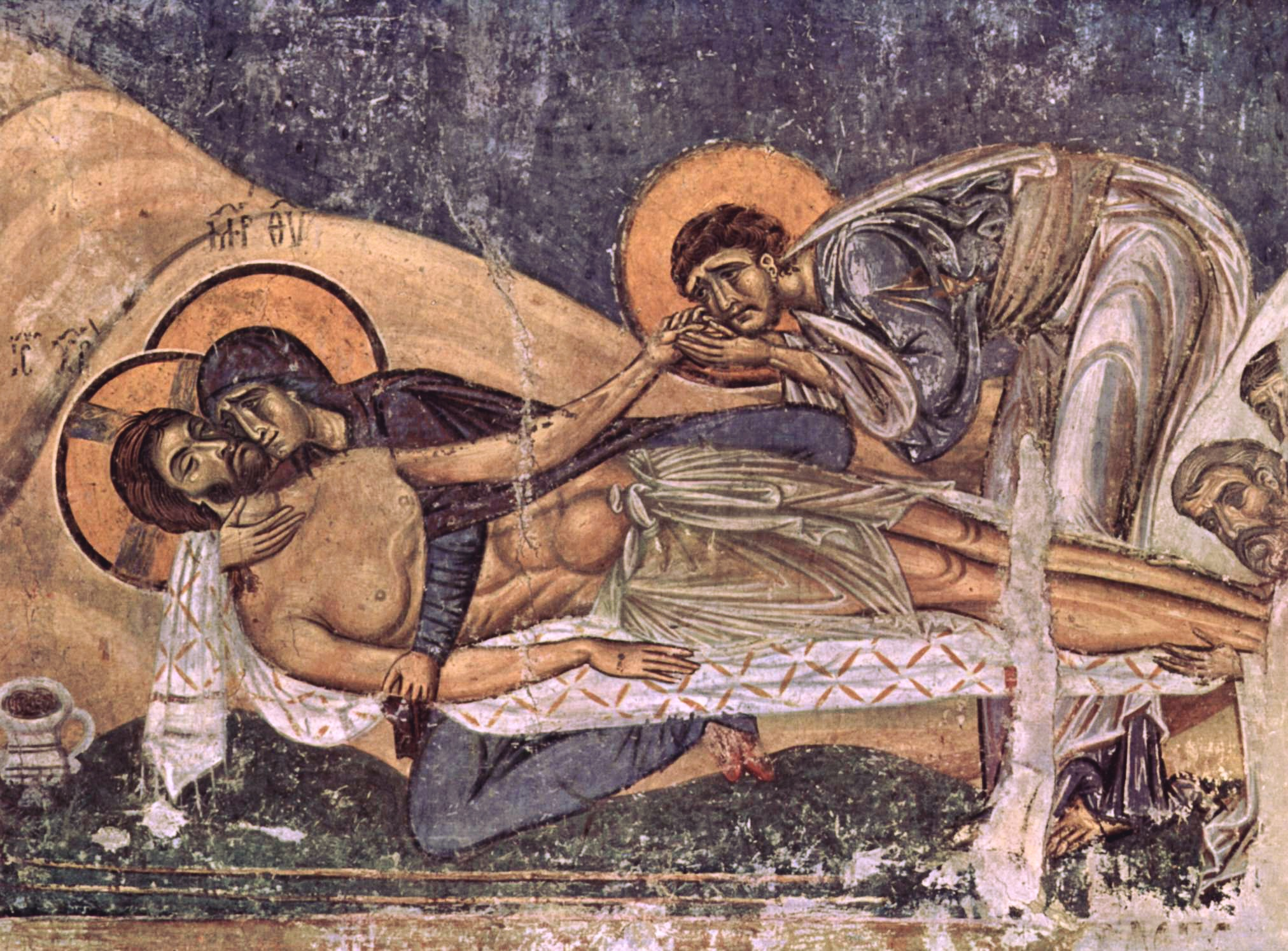
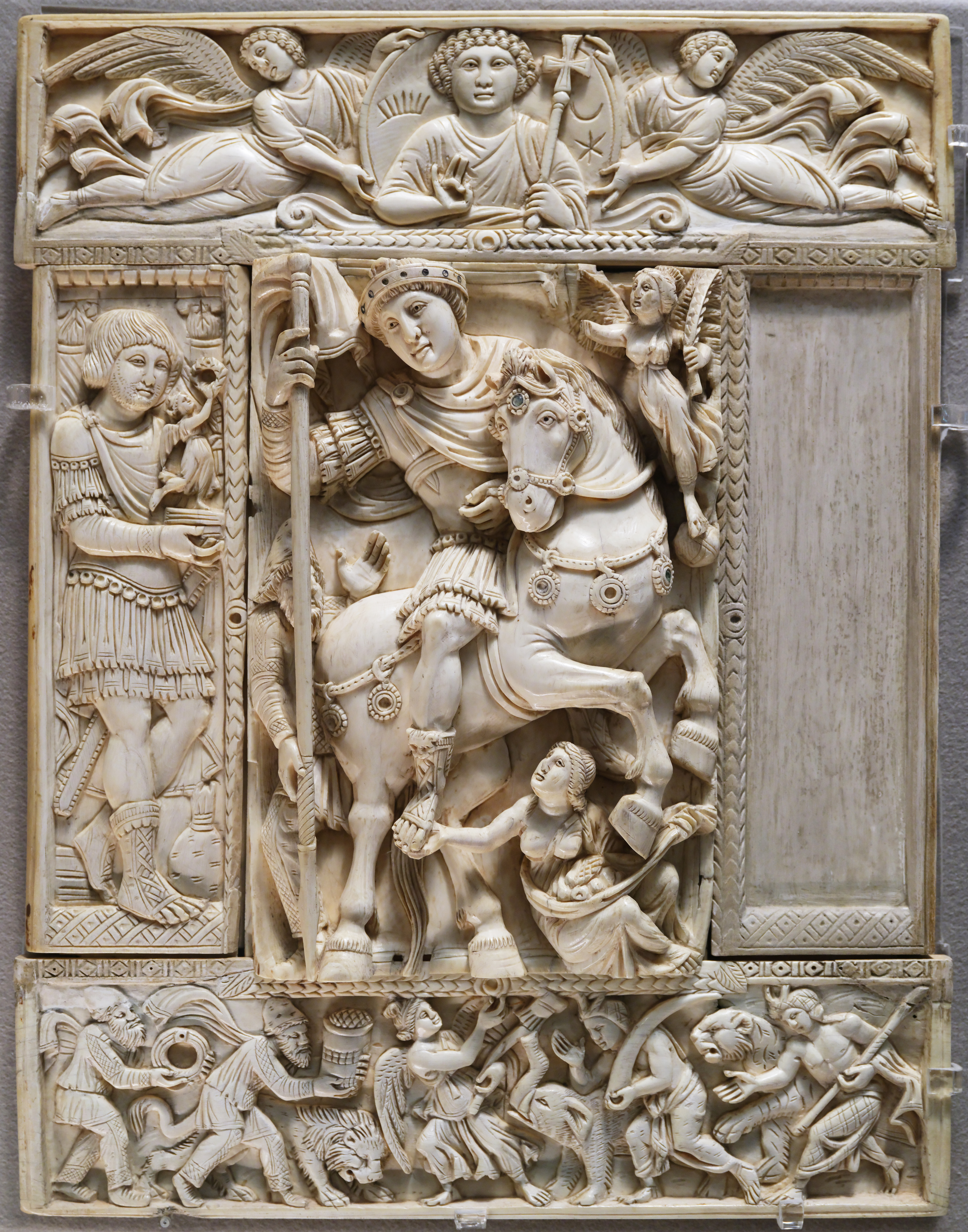
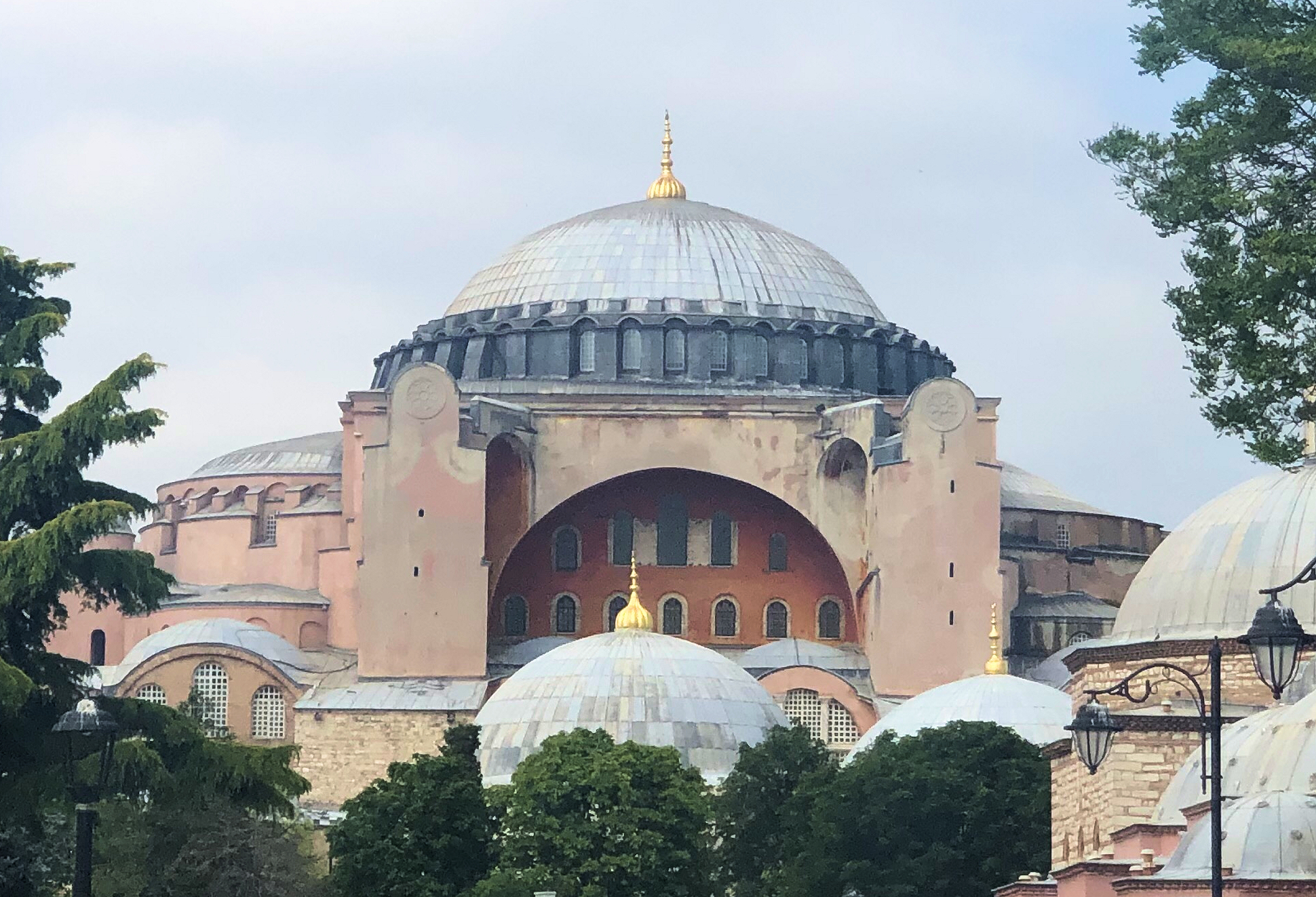
Clockwise, from top left:
- Christ Pantocrator icon, 6th century, Sinai Monastery
- Hosios Loukas mosaics, detail, early 11th century
- Barberini ivory, an early 6th-century ivory diptych
- The Hagia Sophia exterior
- Dead Christ and Mourners, c. 1164, Gorno Nerezi

Subjects in Byzantine art were primarily Christian and typically non-naturalistic in their representation. Emerging from both the earliest Christian and Late Antique art, many early examples were lost amid the Roman Persecutions; the fragmented mosaics of the 3rd-century Dura-Europos church are a unique exception. Such Byzantine mosaics, known for their gold ground style, became a hallmark of the empire, displaying both secular and sacred themes in diverse places, including churches (Basilica of San Vitale), the circus (Hippodrome of Constantinople), and the Great Palace of Constantinople. The early 6th-century reign of Justinian I saw systemic developments: religious art came to dominate, and once-popular public marble and bronze monumental sculpture fell out of favour due to pagan associations. Justinian commissioned the monumental Hagia Sophia church, and its influential elements became architectural hallmarks for the empire: the immense size, large dome, innovative use of pendentives and highly decorative interior were imitated as far north as the Cathedral of Saint Sophia in Novgorod and the Saint Sophia Cathedral in Kiev. The Hagia Sophia's creators, the engineer-architects Isidore of Miletus and Anthemius of Tralles, are uniquely esteemed; most Byzantine artists were unrecorded and typically deemed to have little importance.

Smaller-scale art flourished throughout the entire Byzantine period: costly ivory carvings—often as diptychs (Barberini ivory) or triptychs (Harbaville Triptych)—featured imperial commemorations or religious scenes and were particularly valued, as were metalwork and enamels. Other costly objects included illuminated manuscripts, which were lavishly illustrated for a wide range of texts, and silks, often dyed in the prized imperial purple; both became highly popular in Western Europe. The rise of small, portable icon paintings, used for both public and private religious worship, grew increasingly controversial. During two periods of Byzantine Iconoclasm (726–843), possibly influenced by Islamic prohibitions on religious images, icons were suppressed and enormous amounts of figurative religious art was destroyed. Iconoclasts condemned their use, likening them to pagan idolatry and ascribing recent Umayyad defeats as divine retribution for their use. Iconophiles eventually prevailed, maintaining their essential use for veneration, considered distinct from worship, and found precedent in gospel references.

Post-iconoclast Macedonian art (867–1056) saw a cultural renaissance, and many artworks from this period survive. Subjects and styles became standardised, particularly cross-in-square churches, and already-existing frontality and symmetry evolved into a dominant artistic aesthetic, observable in the small Pala d'Oro enamel and the large mosaics of the Hosios Loukas, Daphni, and Nea Moni monasteries. The subsequent Komnenos-Angelos periods (1081–1204) saw increased imperial patronage, alongside figurative artwork of increased emotional expression (Dead Christ and Mourners, c. 1164). Byzantine artistic influence spread widely to Norman Sicily (the Madrid Skylitzes) and Venice (the mosaics of St Mark's Basilica). Serbian churches flourished, as three successive schools of architecture—Raška (1170–1282), Byzantine Serbia (1282–1355), and Morava (1355–1489)—combined a Romanesque aesthetic with increasingly voluminous decorations and domes. As smaller Palaeologan artworks (1261–1453) gained relic status in Western Europe—many looted in the 1204 Fourth Crusade—they greatly influenced the Italo-Byzantine style of Cimabue, Duccio, and later Giotto; the latter is traditionally regarded by art historians as the inaugurator of Italian Renaissance painting.

=== Literature ===
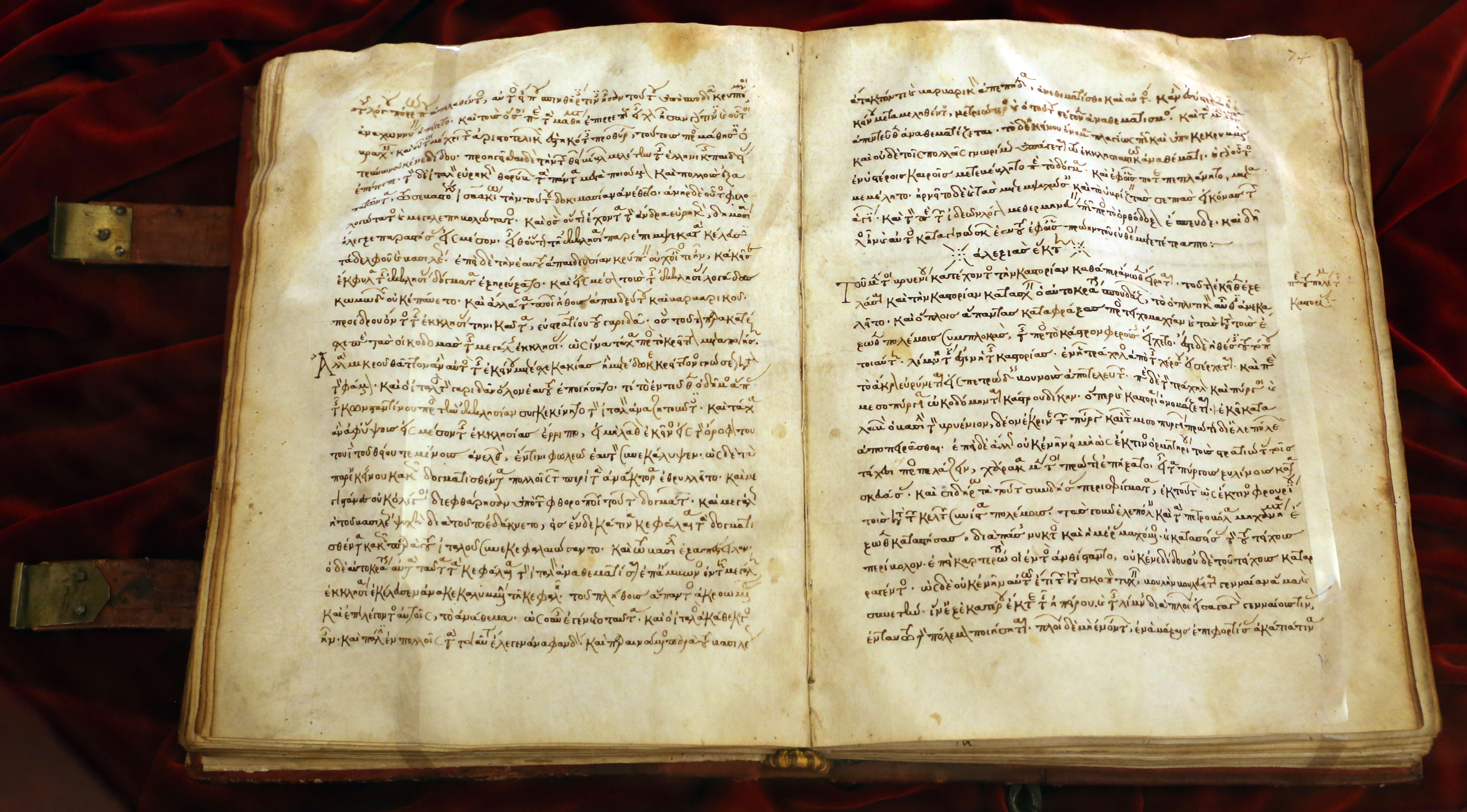
The Alexiad, a history by Anna Komnene, in a 12th-century manuscript. Kept in the Biblioteca Medicea Laurenziana, Florence.

Byzantine literature concerns all Greek literature from the Middle Ages. Although the empire was linguistically diverse, the vast majority of extant texts are in medieval Greek, in two diglossic variants: a scholarly form based on Attic Greek, and a vernacular based on Koine Greek. Most contemporary scholars consider all medieval Greek texts to be literature, but some offer varying constraints. The literature's early period (c. 330–650) was dominated by the competing cultures of Hellenism, Christianity and Paganism. The Greek Church Fathers—educated in an Ancient Greek rhetoric tradition—sought to synthesise these influences. Important early writers include John Chrysostom, Pseudo-Dionysius the Areopagite and Procopius, all of whom aimed to reinvent older forms to fit the empire. Theological miracle stories were particularly innovative and popular; the Sayings of the Desert Fathers (Apophthegmata Patrum) were copied in nearly every Byzantine monastery. During the Byzantine Dark Ages (c. 650–800), production of literature mostly stopped, though some important theologians were active, such as Maximus the Confessor, Germanus I of Constantinople and John of Damascus.

The subsequent cultural Macedonian Renaissance (c. 800–1000; the "Encyclopedism period") saw a renewed proliferation of literature and revived the earlier Hellenic-Christian synthesis. Works by Homer, Ancient Greek philosophers and tragedians were translated, and hagiography was heavily reorganised. After this early flowering of monastic literature, there was a dearth until Symeon the New Theologian in the late 10th century. A new generation (c. 1000–1250), including Symeon, Michael Psellos and Theodore Prodromos, rejected the Encyclopedist emphasis on order, and were interested in individual-focused ideals variously concerning mysticism, authorial voice, heroism, humour and love. This included the Hellenistic-inspired Byzantine romance and chivalric approaches in rhetoric, historiography and the influential epic Digenes Akritas. The empire's final centuries saw a renewal of hagiography and increased Western influence, leading to mass Greek to Latin translations. Authors such as Gemistos Plethon and Bessarion exemplified a new focus on human vices alongside the preservation of classical traditions, the latter greatly influenced the Italian Renaissance.

=== Music ===
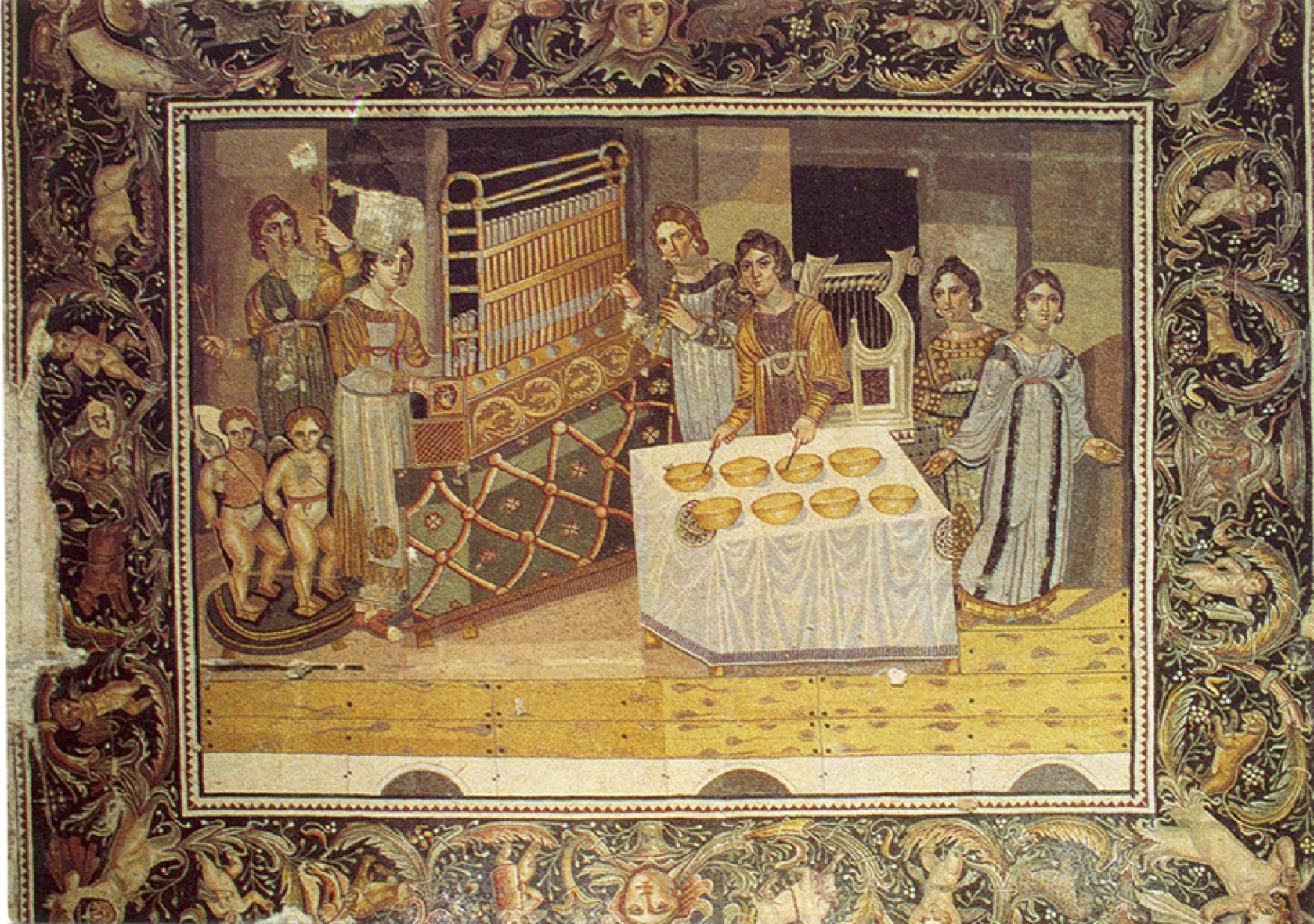
Late 4th-century "Mosaic of the Musicians" playing the organ, aulos, and lyre from a Byzantine villa in Maryamin, Syria

Byzantine music is eclectically descended from early Christian plainsong, Jewish music, and a variety of ancient music; its exact connections to ancient Greek music remain uncertain. It included both sacred and secular traditions, but the latter is little known, whereas the former remains the central music of Eastern Orthodox liturgy into the 21st century. The empire's church music, known as Byzantine chant, was exclusively unaccompanied monodic vocal music, sung in Greek. From the 8th century, chant melodies were governed by the Oktōēchos framework, a set of eight modes—echos (ἦχος; lit. 'sound')—which each provide predetermined motivic formulae for composition. These formulae were chosen for proper text stress and occasionally for text painting, then collated through centonisation into hymns or psalms.

Byzantine chant was central to the Byzantine Rite; the earliest music was not notated, including early monostrophic short hymns like the troparion. Proto-Ekphonetic notation (9th century onwards) marked simple recitation patterns. The neumatic Palaeo-Byzantine notation system emerged in the 10th century, and the Middle Byzantine "Round Notation" from the mid-12th century onwards is the first fully diastematic scheme. Several major forms developed alongside well-known composers: the long kontakion (5th century onwards), popularised by Romanos the Melodist; the also-extensive kanōn (late 7th century onwards), developed by Andrew of Crete; and the shorter sticheron (at least 8th century onwards), championed by Kassia. By the Palaiologan period, the dominance of strict compositional rules lessened and John Koukouzeles led a new school favouring a more ornamental "kalophonic" style which deeply informed post-empire Neo-Byzantine music.

Secular music, often state-sponsored, was ubiquitous in daily life and featured in a variety of ceremonies, festivals, and theatre. Secular vocal music was rarely notated, and extant manuscripts date much later, suggesting the tradition was passed through oral tradition and likely improvised. Prohibited for liturgical use, a wide variety of Byzantine instruments flourished in secular contexts, although no notated instrumental music survives. It is uncertain to what extent instrumentalists improvised or if they doubled vocalists monophonically or heterophonically. Among the best known instruments are the hydraulic organ, used for circus and imperial court events; the ancient Greek-descended aulos, a wind instrument; the tambouras, a plucked string instrument; and mostly popularly, the Byzantine lyra. Prominent genres included acclamation chants of laudation or salutation; the celebratory Acritic songs; symposia instrumental banquets, based on ancient symposiums; and dance music.

=== Science and technology ===
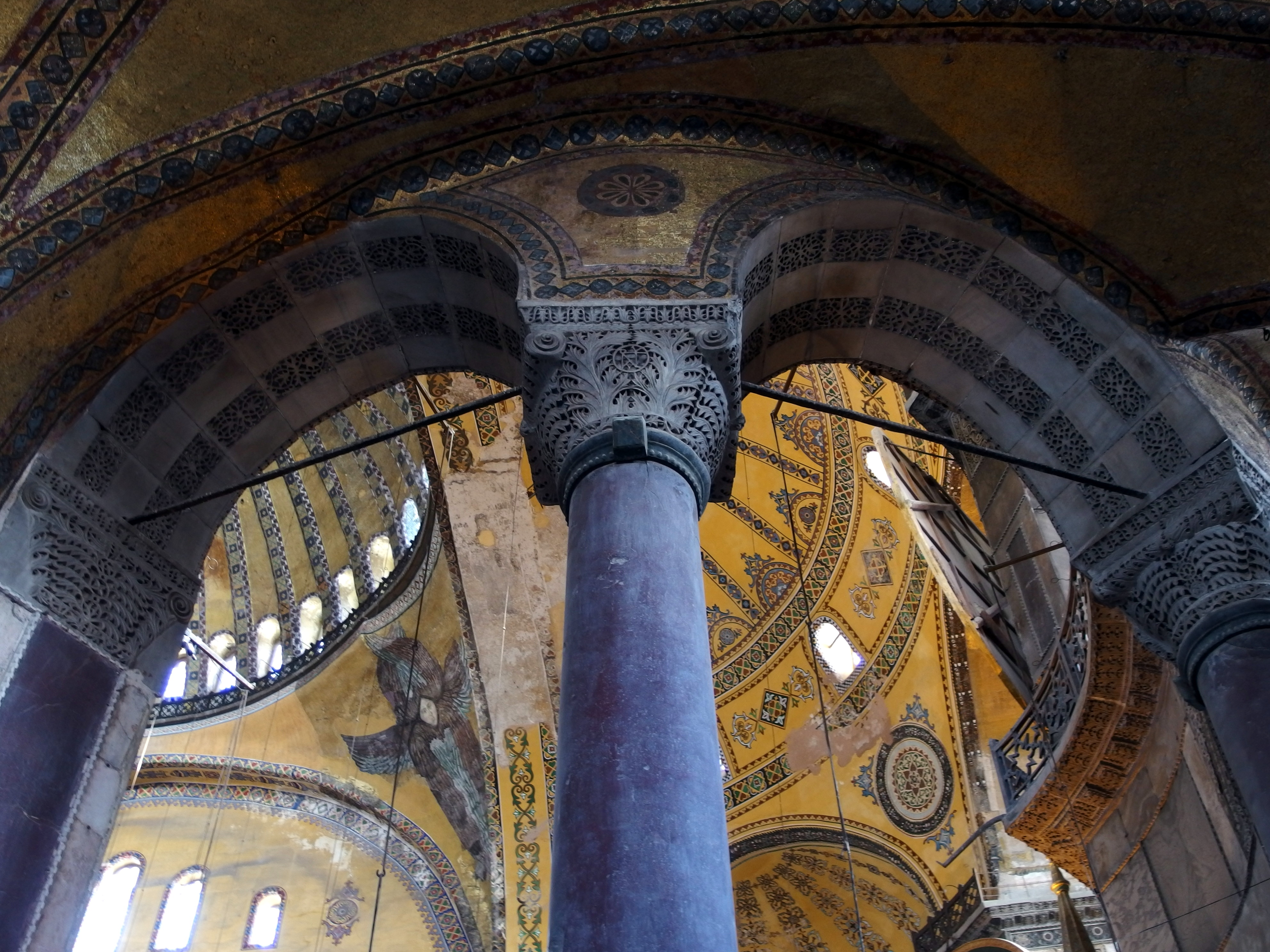
Interior of the Hagia Sophia; the influence of Archimedes' principles of solid geometry is evident.

The scholars of the empire played a principal role in transmitting classical knowledge to the Islamic world and Renaissance Italy, as well as producing commentaries that helped expand scientific knowledge. This medieval Greek scholarship was not only based on scientific treatises from antiquity but also drew from Islamic, Latin, and Hebrew works, which helped spearhead new developments as late as the 11th and 12th centuries. Although the Empire is sometimes not associated with scientific innovation or major discoveries, its scientific contributions have also been described as underestimated. Incomplete assessments of Byzantine texts and the challenges of applying modern definitions of science to pre-modern contexts are factors in these ongoing debates.

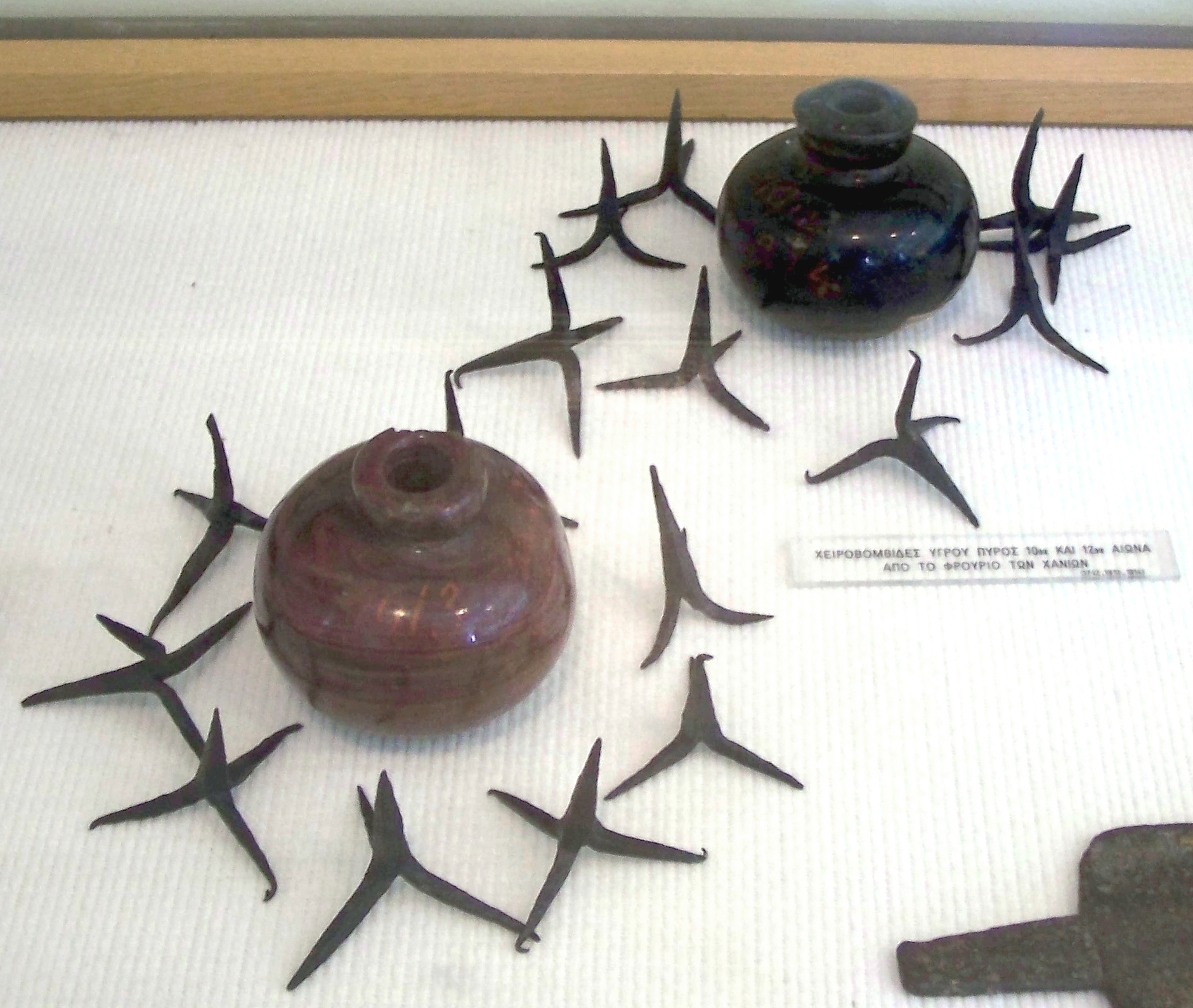
Ceramic grenades which were filled with Greek fire, surrounded by caltrops, 10th–12th century, National Historical Museum, Athens

Key people passed on important traditions that underpinned this scholarship, especially in the realms of philosophy, geometry, astronomy, and grammar. For example, the Hagia Sophia architect Isidore of Miletus (c. 530), compiled Archimedes' works which Leo the Mathematician (c. 850) incorporated into formal courses, and is why the Archimedes Palimpsest is known today. John Philoponus and his critiques of Aristotelian physics, the pharmacologist Pedanius Dioscorides, and Ptolematic geography and astronomy had an important influence on western science, as seen with Ptolemy's influence on Copernicus and Philoponus on Bonaventure, Gersonides, Buridan, Oresme and Galileo.

Military innovations included the riding stirrup which provided stability for mounted archers and dramatically transformed the army; a specialised type of horseshoe; the lateen sail, which improved a ship's responsiveness to wind; and Greek fire—an incendiary weapon capable of burning even when doused with water, first appearing around the time of the Siege of Constantinople (674–678). In healthcare, the empire pioneered the concept of the hospital as an institution offering medical care and the possibility of a cure for the patients, rather than merely being a place to die.

== Legacy ==
=== Political aftermath ===
The Eastern Mediterranean just before the Fall of Constantinople

After Constantinople fell, the Ottomans quickly absorbed the remaining independent territories, including Acciaiuoli Athens in 1458, Morea in 1460, Trebizond in 1461, and Gattilusi Lesbos in 1462. They dismantled the Empire's political and secular institutions, leaving the impoverished Church to manage what would be later called the Rum Millet, primarily as a tool for taxing its followers. As the sole sovereign Orthodox state, Russia developed the Third Rome doctrine, emphasising its cultural heritage as distinct from Western Europe, because the latter had inherited much of the empire's secular learning. The Danubian Principalities became a haven for Orthodox Christians and Phanariot Greeks who sought to recreate a Byzantine Greek Empire. In modern Greece, members of the Rum Millet increasingly identified as Greeks, eventually leading to a successful war of independence in the 19th century. The modern Greek state nearly doubled its territory through the pursuit of the Megali Idea—a vision of reclaiming the former lands of the eastern empire—achieving limited success during the Crimean War but making significant gains during the Balkan Wars.

Since the 15th century, Byzantine history has been deeply politicised, woven into nationalist, colonialist, and imperialist narratives. This politicisation appears not only in Greece but also in Bulgarian, Romanian, Serbian, Hungarian, and Turkish nationalism, as well as in former French and Russian imperialist agendas. In the English-speaking world, interpretations of Byzantine history frequently surface in political debates, alongside the growing appreciation for its legacy. The complexity of this history makes it a sensitive topic, especially regarding Greece's role in Europe's evolving sense of identity and the origin stories of many European nations.

=== Cultural aftermath ===
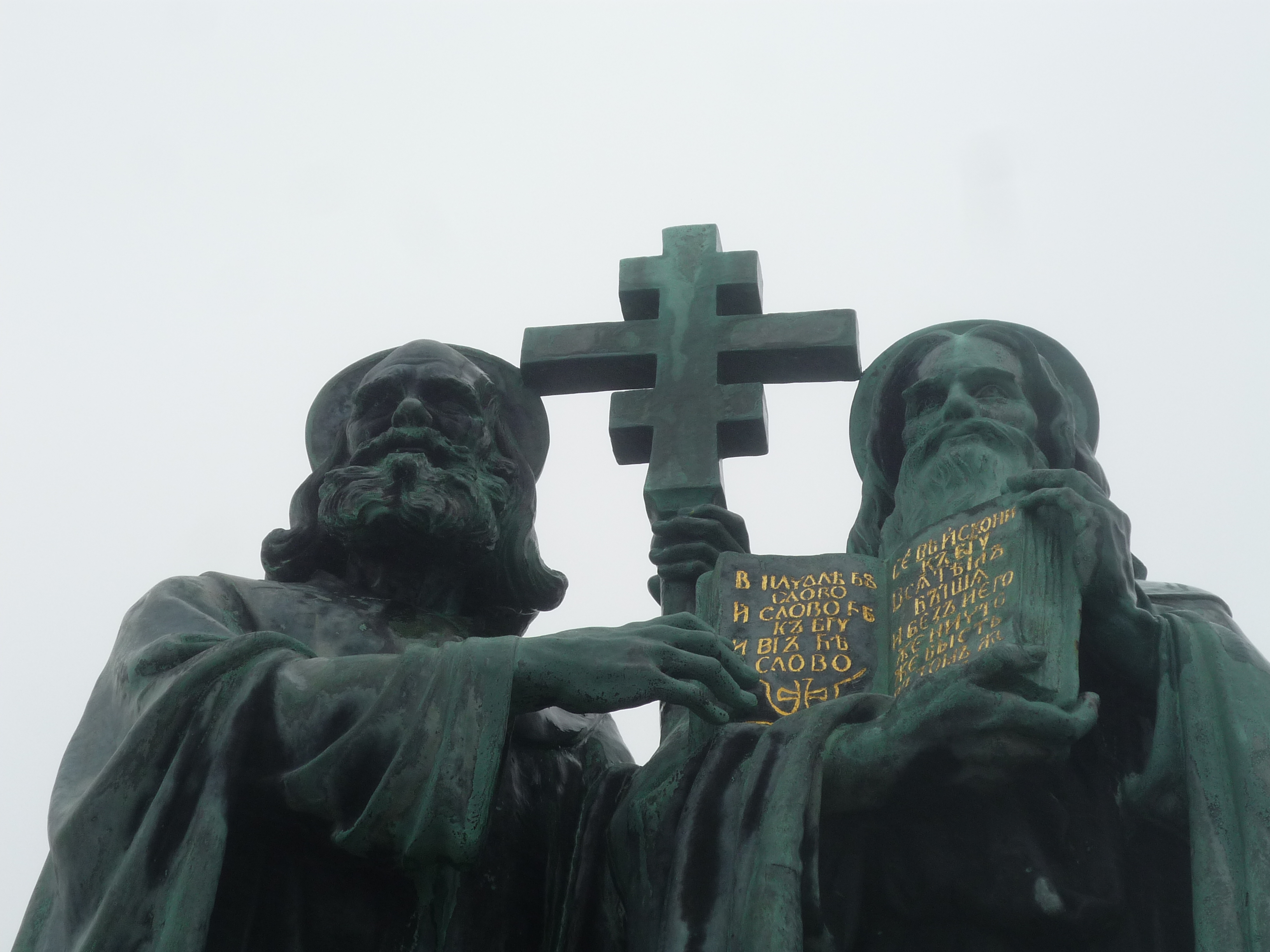
Monument to St. Cyril and St. Methodius, Byzantine missionaries to the Slavs, on Mt. Radhošť in Czechia

The Byzantine Empire distinctively blended Roman political traditions, Greek literary heritage, and Christianity, creating the civilisational framework that laid the foundation for medieval Europe. The Empire preserved European civilisation by acting as a shield against forces from Eurasian Steppe people such as the Avars, Bulgars, Cumans, Huns, Pechenegs, and Turks.

The empire's legal codes significantly influenced the civil law traditions of continental Europe, Russia, Latin America, Ethiopia, and even the English-speaking common law countries; and possibly influenced Islamic legal traditions as well. It also preserved and transmitted classical learning and manuscripts, making important contributions to the intellectual revival which fuelled Italian humanism.

The Byzantine Empire played a pivotal role in shaping Christianity by supporting early Church fathers and the decisions of Church councils; developing the institution of monasticism; and fostering the Orthodox tradition which continues to define much of Eastern European identity. It was also instrumental in preserving the Greek language and is credited with developing the Glagolitic alphabet, which later evolved into the Cyrillic script and Old Church Slavonic. These innovations provided the first literary language for the Slavs and formed the educational foundation for all Slavic nations.

== See also ==
- List of Byzantine emperors
- Byzantine dress
- Family tree of Byzantine emperors
- List of Byzantine revolts and civil wars
- List of Byzantine wars
- List of Roman dynasties
- List of bishops and Ecumenical Patriarchs of Constantinople
- Outline of the Byzantine Empire

== Bibliography ==
=== Books ===
- Andronikou, Anthi (2022). Italy, Cyprus, and Artistic Exchange in the Medieval Mediterranean. Cambridge: Cambridge University Press. ISBN 978-1-316-51092-6.
- Ash, John (1995). A Byzantine Journey. New York: Random House. ISBN 978-1-84511-307-0.
- Bartusis, Mark (1997). The late Byzantine army: arms and society, 1204-1453. Philadelphia: University of Pennsylvania Press. ISBN 978-0-8122-1620-2.
- Berndt, Guido M. [in German]; Steinacher, Roland (2014). Arianism: Roman Heresy and Barbarian Creed (1st ed.). London: Routledge. ISBN 978-1-4094-4659-0.
- Bennett, David (2016). Medicine and Pharmacy in Byzantine Hospitals: A Study of the Extant Formularies. London: Routledge. ISBN 978-0-3678-7908-2.
- Browning, Robert (1992). The Byzantine Empire. Washington DC: The Catholic University of America Press. ISBN 978-0-8132-0754-4.
- Cameron, Averil (2010). The Byzantines. The Peoples of Europe. Oxford: Wiley-Blackwell. ISBN 978-1-4051-9833-2.
- Cameron, Averil (2017). Byzantine Christianity: A Very Brief History. London: Society for Promoting Christian Knowledge. ISBN 9780281076147.
- Chitwood, Zachary (2017). Byzantine Legal Culture and the Roman Legal Tradition, 867–1056. Cambridge: Cambridge University Press. ISBN 978-1-107-18256-1.
- Clark, Victoria (2000). Why Angels Fall: A Journey through Orthodox Europe from Byzantium to Kosovo. London: Macmillan. ISBN 978-0-312-23396-9.
- Cormack, Robin (2018) [2000]. Byzantine Art (2nd ed.). Oxford: Oxford University Press. ISBN 978-0-19-877879-0.
- Davidson, Alan (2014). Jaine, Tom (ed.). The Oxford Companion to Food. Oxford: Oxford University Press. ISBN 978-0-19-967733-7. Archived from the original on 14 May 2016.
- Decker, Michael (2013). The Byzantine Art of War. Yardley: Westholme Publishing. ISBN 978-1-5941-6168-1.
- Faas, Patrick (2005) [1994]. Around the Roman Table: Food and Feasting in Ancient Rome. Chicago: University of Chicago Press. ISBN 978-0-226-23347-5. Archived from the original on 30 July 2016.
- Gregory, Timothy E. (2010). A History of Byzantium. Malden: Wiley-Blackwell. ISBN 978-1-4051-8471-7.
- Haldon, John (1999). Warfare, State and Society in the Byzantine World. London: UCL Press. ISBN 978-1-8572-8495-9.
- Horrocks, Geoffrey (2010). Greek: A History of the Language and its Speakers (2nd ed.). Wiley. ISBN 978-1-4051-3415-6.
- Howard-Johnston, James (2024). Byzantium: Economy, Society, Institutions 600–1100. Oxford: Oxford University Press. ISBN 9780198897880.
- Kaldellis, Anthony (2007). Hellenism in Byzantium: The Transformations of Greek Identity and the Reception of the Classical Tradition. Cambridge: Cambridge University Press. ISBN 978-0-521-87688-9.
- ——— (2023). The New Roman Empire: A History of Byzantium. New York: Oxford University Press. ISBN 978-0197549322.
- ——— (1999). A History of Byzantine Literature (650–850). Athens: Institute for Byzantine Research. ISBN 978-960-371-010-3.
- Laiou, Angeliki E.; Morrisson, Cécile (2007). The Byzantine Economy. Cambridge: Cambridge University Press. ISBN 978-0-521-84978-4.
- Lindberg, David (1992). The Beginnings of Western Science. Chicago: University of Chicago Press. ISBN 9780226482057.
- Lindberg, David C.; Shank, Michael H., eds. (2013). The Cambridge History of Science. Vol. 2: Medieval Science. Cambridge University Press. doi:10.1017/CHO9780511974007. ISBN 978-0-511-97400-7.
  - Tihon, Anne. "Science in the Byzantine Empire". In Lindberg & Shank (2013), pp. 190–206.
- Lowden, John (1997). Early Christian & Byzantine Art. London: Phaidon Press. ISBN 978-0-7148-3168-8.
- Matthews, Roy T.; Platt, F. DeWitt (1997). The Western Humanities. East Lansing: Michigan State University. ISBN 9781559344333.
- Mellas, Andrew (2020). Liturgy and the Emotions in Byzantium: Compunction and Hymnody. Cambridge: Cambridge University Press. ISBN 978-1-108-76736-1.
- Merryman, John Henry; Pérez-Perdomo, Rogelio (2007). The Civil Law Tradition: An Introduction to the Legal Systems of Europe and Latin America (3rd ed.). Stanford, California: Stanford University Press. ISBN 978-0-8047-5568-9.
- Meyendorff, John [in Russian] (1979). Byzantine Theology: Historical Trends and Doctrinal Themes (PDF) (illustrated, reprint, revised ed.). New York: Fordham University Press. ISBN 978-0-8232-0967-5. Archived (PDF) from the original on 23 August 2024.
- Millar, Fergus (2006). A Greek Roman Empire: Power and Belief under Theodosius II (408–450). Berkeley: University of California Press. ISBN 978-0-520-24703-1.
- Miller, Timothy S. (1997). The Birth of the Hospital in the Byzantine Empire. Baltimore: Johns Hopkins University Press. ISBN 978-0-8018-5657-0.
- Nicol, Donald M. (1993). The Last Centuries of Byzantium, 1261–1453 (2nd ed.). London: Rupert Hart-Davis. ISBN 9780521439916. Archived from the original on 9 July 2023.
- Obolensky, Dimitri (1994). Byzantium and the Slavs. Yonkers: St Vladimir's Seminary Press. ISBN 978-0-88141-008-2.
- Partington, J. R. (1999). A History of Greek Fire and Gunpowder. Baltimore: The Johns Hopkins University Press. ISBN 9780801859540.
- Ring, Trudy (1994). International Dictionary of Historic Places: Middle East and Africa. Vol. 4. London: Taylor & Francis. ISBN 978-1-884964-03-9. Archived from the original on 9 June 2019.
- Robins, Robert Henry (1993). The Byzantine Grammarians: Their Place in History. Berlin: Mouton de Gruyter. ISBN 978-3-11-013574-9.
- Rodley, Lyn (1994). Byzantine Art and Architecture: An Introduction. Cambridge: Cambridge University Press. ISBN 978-0-521-35724-1.
- Rotman, Youval (2009). Byzantine Slavery and the Mediterranean World. Cambridge, Massachusetts: Harvard University Press. ISBN 978-0-674-03611-6.
- ——— (2022). Slaveries of the First Millennium. Amsterdam: Amsterdam University Press. doi:10.2307/j.ctv2175h0p. ISBN 978-1-64189-172-1. JSTOR j.ctv2175h0p.
- Sabo, Theodore (2018). From Monophysitism to Nestorianism: AD 431–681. Newcastle upon Tyne: Cambridge Scholars Publishing. ISBN 978-1-5275-0959-7.
- Seton-Watson, Hugh (1967). The Russian Empire, 1801–1917. London: Oxford University Press. ISBN 978-0-1982-2152-4.
- Stathakopoulos, Dionysios Ch. (2023). A Short History of the Byzantine Empire. Short Histories. London: Bloomsbury Academic. ISBN 978-1-350-23340-9.
- Stein, Peter (1999). Roman Law in European History. Cambridge: Cambridge University Press. doi:10.1017/cbo9780511814723. ISBN 978-0-521-64372-6.
- Tatakes, Vasileios N.; Moutafakis, Nicholas J. (2003). Byzantine Philosophy. Indianapolis: Hackett. ISBN 978-0-8722-0563-5.
- Treadgold, Warren T. (1995). Byzantium and its Army: 284–1081. Stanford: Stanford University Press. ISBN 978-0-8047-3163-8.
- Treadgold, Warren (1997). A History of the Byzantine State and Society. Stanford, California: Stanford University Press. ISBN 0-8047-2630-2.
- Treadgold, Warren T. (1997b). A History of the Byzantine State and Society. Redwood City: Stanford University Press. ISBN 978-0-8047-7937-1.
- Treadgold, Warren (2025). A Concise History of Byzantium, 25th Anniversary Edition. Bloomsbury Academic. ISBN 978-1-350-54133-7.
- Unwin, P. T. H. (2010). Wine and the Vine: An Historical Geography of Viticulture and the Wine Trade. London: Routledge. ISBN 978-0-415-14416-2.
- Vryonis, Speros (1971). The Decline of Medieval Hellenism in Asia Minor and the Process of Islamization from the Eleventh through the Fifteenth Century. Berkeley: University of California Press. ISBN 978-0-520-01597-5. Archived from the original on 26 June 2020.

=== Journals ===
- Adams, Robert Merrihew (2021). "Nestorius and Nestorianism". The Monist. 104 (3): 366–375. doi:10.1093/monist/onab005.
- Brown, Peter (1976). "Eastern and Western Christendom in Late Antiquity: A Parting of the Way". Studies in Church History. 13: 1–24. doi:10.1017/S0424208400006574.
- Browning, Robert (1982). "Greek diglossia yesterday and today". International Journal of the Sociology of Language (35): 49–68. doi:10.1515/ijsl.1982.35.49.
- Cameron, Averil (2016). "Late Antiquity and Byzantium: An Identity Problem". Byzantine and Modern Greek Studies. 40 (1): 27–37. doi:10.1017/byz.2015.4.
- van Dieten, Jan Louis (1980). "Die Byzantinische Literatur – Eine Literatur Ohne Geschichte?" [Byzantine Literature – A Literature Without History?]. Historische Zeitschrift (in German). 231 (H 1): 101–109. doi:10.1524/hzhz.1980.231.jg.101. JSTOR 27621785.
- Dingledy, Frederick (2 May 2019). The Corpus Juris Civilis: A Guide to Its History and Use. Legal Reference Services Quarterly. Vol. 35, no. 4. doi:10.31228/osf.io/meq6c.
- Horn, Fred; Schädler, Ulrich (31 May 2019). "3.4 Forensic Game Reconstruction". Foundations of Digital Archæoludology. pp. 9–10. arXiv:1905.13516.
- Ivanič, Peter (2016). "The Origins of Christianity in the Territory of Czech and Slovak Republics Within the Contexts of Written Sources". European Journal of Science and Theology. 12 (6): 123–130. Archived from the original on 6 June 2023.
- Ivanova, Mirela; Anderson, Benjamin (1 October 2024). "The Politics of Byzantine Studies: Between Nations and Empires". The English Historical Review. 139 (600): 1230–1249. doi:10.1093/ehr/ceae159. ISSN 0013-8266.
- Jones, Alexander (2005). "The Works of Archimedes: Translation and Commentary. Volume 1: The Two Books On the Sphere and the Cylinder" (PDF). Notices of the AMS. 52 (5): 520–525. Archived (PDF) from the original on 2 March 2022.
- Magdalino, Paul (18 December 2025). "The Foundation of Constantinople and the Beginnings of Byzantine Studies". Études byzantines et post-byzantines. 7: 23–43. doi:10.66292/ebpb.2025.02. ISSN 0259-0913.
- Nicholson, Graham (1960). "The Understanding of Papal Supremacy as Revealed in the Letters of Pope Gregory the Great" (PDF). Theological Studies. 11: 25–51. Archived (PDF) from the original on 7 November 2023.
- Nicolaidis, Efthymios; Delli, Eudoxie; Livanos, Nikolaos; Tampakis, Kostas; Vlahakis, George (2016). "Science and Orthodox Christianity: An Overview". Isis. 107 (3): 542–566. doi:10.1086/688704. PMID 28707856.
- Poppe, Andrzej (1991). "Christianity and Ideological change in Kievan Rus': The First Hundred Years". Canadian-American Slavic Studies. 25 (1–4): 3–26. doi:10.1163/221023991X00038.
- Salogubova, Elena; Zenkov, Alan (15 June 2018). "Roman Law's Influence on Russian Civil Law and Procedure" (PDF). Russian Law Journal. 6 (2): 118–133. doi:10.17589/2309-8678-2018-6-2-118-133 (inactive 28 June 2026). ISSN 2312-3605. Archived (PDF) from the original on 10 January 2025.

=== Book chapters and encyclopaedias ===
- Angold, Michael, ed. (2006). The Cambridge History of Christianity. Vol. 5. Cambridge: Cambridge University Press. ISBN 9781139054089.
  - Micheau, Françoise. "Eastern Christianities (Eleventh to Fourteenth Century): Copts, Melkites, Nestorians and Jacobites". In Angold (2006), pp. 371–403.
  - Shepard, Jonathan. "The Byzantine Commonwealth 1000–1550". In Angold (2006), pp. 1–52.
- Aschenbrenner, Nathanael; Ransohoff, Jake (2022). The Invention of Byzantium in Early Modern Europe. Washington DC: Harvard University Press. ISBN 978-0-88402-484-2.
  - Aschenbrenner, Nathanael; Ransohoff, Jake (2022a). Introduction. In Aschenbrenner & Ransohoff (2022), pp. 1–23.
  - Kaldellis, Anthony (2022a). "From "Empire of the Greeks" to "Byzantium"". In Aschenbrenner & Ransohoff (2022), pp. 349–367.
  - Aschenbrenner, Nathanael; Ransohoff, Jake (2022b). "Conclusion". In Aschenbrenner & Ransohoff (2022), pp. 369–382.
- Browning, Robert (2022). "Greek Literature: Byzantine Literature". In Lucas, Donald William; Mackridge, Peter A. (eds.). Encyclopædia Britannica. Chicago: Encyclopædia Britannica.
- Cameron, Averil (2002). "The 'Long' Late Antiquity: A Twentieth-Century Model". In Wiseman, T. P. (ed.). Classics in Progress: Essays on Ancient Greece and Rome. Oxford: Oxford University Press. pp. 165–191. ISBN 9780197263235. Archived from the original on 9 February 2024.
- Casiday, Augustine; Norris, Frederick W., eds. (2007). The Cambridge History of Christianity. Vol. 2. Cambridge: Cambridge University Press. ISBN 9781139054133.
  - Casiday, Augustine; Norris, Frederick W. (2007a). Introduction. In Casiday & Norris (2007), pp. 1–5.
  - Drake, Harold A. "The Church, Society and Political Power". In Casiday & Norris (2007), pp. 403–428.
  - Löhr, Winrich. "Western Christianities". In Casiday & Norris (2007), pp. 7–51.
- Cormack, Robin; Haldon, John F.; Jeffreys, Elizabeth, eds. (2008). The Oxford Handbook of Byzantine Studies. Oxford: Oxford University Press. ISBN 978-0-1917-4352-8.
  - Bryer, Anthony. "Food, Wine, and Feasting". In Cormack, Haldon & Jeffreys (2008), pp. 669–676.
  - Decker, Michael. "Everyday Technologies". In Cormack, Haldon & Jeffreys (2008), pp. 492–502.
  - Greatrex, Geoffrey. "Political-Historical Survey, c. 250–518". In Cormack, Haldon & Jeffreys (2008), pp. 233–248.
  - Haldon, John F. (2008a). "Political-Historical Survey, c. 518–800". In Cormack, Haldon & Jeffreys (2008), pp. 249–263.
  - Haldon, John F. (2008b). "The Army". In Cormack, Haldon & Jeffreys (2008), pp. 554–561.
  - Holmes, Catherine. "Political-Historical Survey, 800–1204". In Cormack, Haldon & Jeffreys (2008), pp. 264–279.
  - Horrocks, Geoffrey. "Language". In Cormack, Haldon & Jeffreys (2008), pp. 777–784.
  - Howard-Johnston, James F. "Byzantium and Its Neighbours". In Cormack, Haldon & Jeffreys (2008), pp. 939–956.
  - Jeffreys, Elizabeth (2008a). "Entertainments, Theatre, And Hippodrome". In Cormack, Haldon & Jeffreys (2008), pp. 677–684.
  - Laiou, Angeliki. "Political-Historical Survey, 1204–1453". In Cormack, Haldon & Jeffreys (2008), pp. 280–294.
  - Mango, Cyril. "Byzantium's Role in World History". In Cormack, Haldon & Jeffreys (2008), pp. 957–961.
  - Stathakopoulos, Dionysios Ch. "Population, Demography, and Disease". In Cormack, Haldon & Jeffreys (2008), pp. 309–316.
- Curl, James Stevens; Wilson, Susan (2021). "Byzantine Architecture". The Oxford Dictionary of Architecture (3rd Edition Revised ed.). Oxford: Oxford University Press. ISBN 978-0-19-191874-2.
- Garland, Lynda (2006). Byzantine Women: Varieties of Experience, 800–1200. Publications for the Centre for Hellenic Studies, King's College, London. Aldershot, Burlington: Ashgate. ISBN 978-0-7546-5737-8.
- Haarer, F. K. (2010). "Writing Histories of Byzantium: The Historiography of Byzantine History". In James, Liz (ed.). A Companion to Byzantium. London: John Wiley & Sons. pp. 9–21. doi:10.1002/9781444320015.ch2. ISBN 978-1-4443-2001-5.
- James, Liz (2003) [2001]. "Byzantine Art". In Brigstocke, Hugh (ed.). The Oxford Companion to Western Art. Oxford: Oxford University Press. ISBN 978-0-19-866203-7.
- Johnson, Scott Fitzgerald, ed. (2015). The Oxford Handbook of Late Antiquity. Oxford: Oxford University Press. ISBN 978-0-19-027753-6.
  - Kaiser, Wolfgang. "Justinian and the Corpus Iuris Civilis". In Johnson (2015), pp. 119–148.
  - Stolte, Bernard H. "The Law of New Rome: Byzantine Law". In Johnson (2015), pp. 355–373.
- Kaldellis, Anthony (18 September 2015). "Late Antiquity Dissolves". Marginalia: Forum on Late Antiquity and the Humanities. Archived from the original on 13 December 2023.
- ——— (2021a). "The Byzantine Empire (641–1453 CE)". In Fibiger Bang, Peter; Bayly, C. A.; Scheidel, Walter (eds.). The Oxford World History of Empire: Volume Two: The History of Empires. New York: Oxford University Press. pp. 450–467. ISBN 9780197532768.
- Kazhdan, Alexander Petrovich, ed. (1991a). Oxford Dictionary of Byzantium. Vol. 2. Oxford: Oxford University Press. ISBN 978-0-19-504652-6.
  - Browning, Robert. "Language". In Kazhdan (1991a), pp. 1175–1177.
  - Conomos, Dimitri E. (1991). "Music". In Kazhdan (1991a), pp. 1424–1426.
  - Conomos, Dimitri E.; Kazhdan, Alexander (1991). "Musical Instruments". In Kazhdan (1991a), pp. 1426–1427.
  - Kazhdan, Alexander Petrovich (1991b). "Literature". In Kazhdan (1991a), pp. 1234–1237.
- Laiou, Angeliki E., ed. (2002a). The Economic History of Byzantium. From the Seventh Through the Fifteenth Century. Vol. 1. Washington DC: Dumbarton Oaks. ISBN 9780884022886.
- Laiou, Angeliki E., ed. (2002b). The Economic History of Byzantium. From the Seventh Through the Fifteenth Century. Vol. 2. Washington DC: Dumbarton Oaks. ISBN 978-0884022886.
  - Kazanaki-Lappa, Maria (2002). "Medieval Athens". In Laiou (2002b), pp. 625–632.
  - Laiou, Angeliki E. (2002c). "Exchange and Trade, Seventh-Twelfth Centuries". In Laiou (2002b), pp. 681–754.
  - Magdalino, Paul (2002b). "Medieval Constantinople: Built Environment and Urban Development". In Laiou (2002b), pp. 519–527.
  - Matschke, Klaus-Peter (2002). "Commerce, Trade, Markets, and Money: Thirteenth-Fifteenth Centuries". In Laiou (2002b), pp. 771–806.
- Lazaris, Stavros (2020). A Companion to Byzantine Science. Brill's Companions to the Byzantine World. Vol. 6. Leiden: Brill. doi:10.1163/9789004414617. ISBN 978-90-04-41461-7.
  - Lazaris, Stavros (2020a). Introduction. In Lazaris (2020), pp. 1–26.
  - Inglebert, Herv. "1. ‘Inner’ and ‘Outer’ Knowledge: the Debate between Faith and Reason in Late Antiquity". In Lazaris (2020), pp. 27–52.
  - Manolova, Divna. "2. Science Teaching and Learning Methods in Byzantium". In Lazaris (2020), pp. 53–104.
  - Telelis, Ioannis. "5. Meteorology and Physics in Byzantium". In Lazaris (2020), pp. 177–201.
  - Salmon, Thomas. "12. The Byzantine Science of Warfare: from Treatises to Battlefield". In Lazaris (2020), pp. 429–463.
- Lenski, Noel (12 August 2021). "Slavery in the Byzantine Empire". In Perry, Craig; Eltis, David; Engerman, Stanley L.; Richardson, David (eds.). The Cambridge World History of Slavery. Vol. 2: AD 500–AD 1420. Cambridge: Cambridge University Press. pp. 453–481. doi:10.1017/9781139024723.019. ISBN 978-1-139-02472-3.
- Levy, Kenneth (2016) [2001]. "Byzantine Chant". In Troelsgård, Christian (ed.). Grove Music Online. Revised by Christian Troelsgård. Oxford: Oxford University Press. doi:10.1093/gmo/9781561592630.article.04494. ISBN 978-1-56159-263-0. (subscription, Wikilibrary access, or UK public library membership required)
- Louth, Andrew (2005). "The Byzantine Empire in the Seventh Century". In Fouracre, Paul (ed.). New Cambridge Medieval History. Vol. 1: c. 500 – c. 700. pp. 289–316. ISBN 9781139053938.
- Mango, Cyril A., ed. (2002). The Oxford History of Byzantium. Oxford: Oxford University Press. ISBN 978-0-19-814098-6.
  - Jeffreys, Elizabeth; Mango, Cyril. "Towards a Franco-Greek Culture". In Mango (2002), pp. 294–305.
  - Magdalino, Paul. "The Medieval Empire (780–1204)". In Mango (2002), pp. 169–213.
  - Reinert, Stephen W. "Fragmentation (1204–1453)". In Mango (2002), pp. 248–283.
  - Treadgold, Warren. "The Struggle for Survival (641–780)". In Mango (2002), pp. 129–152.
- Mitchell, Margaret M.; Young, Frances, eds. (2006). The Cambridge History of Christianity. Vol. 1. Cambridge: Cambridge University Press. ISBN 978-1-139-05483-6.
  - Cameron, Averil (2006b). "Constantine and the 'Peace of the Church'". In Mitchell & Young (2006), pp. 538–551.
- Nicol, Donald M. (1988). "Byzantine Political Thought". In Burns, J. H. (ed.). The Cambridge History of Medieval Political Thought, c. 350–c. 1450. Cambridge: Cambridge University Press. pp. 51–79. ISBN 978-0-52-142388-5.
- Noble, Thomas F. X.; Smith, Julia M. H., eds. (2008). The Cambridge History of Christianity. Vol. 3. Cambridge: Cambridge University Press. ISBN 978-1-139-05422-5.
  - Brown, Peter. "Introduction: Christendom, c. 600". In Noble & Smith (2008), pp. 1–18.
  - Kolbaba, Tia M. "Latin and Greek Christians". In Noble & Smith (2008), pp. 213–229.
  - Louth, Andrew. "The Emergence of Byzantine Orthodoxy, 600–1095". In Noble & Smith (2008), pp. 46–64.
- Nutton, Vivian (1984). "From Galen to Alexander, Aspects of Medicine and Medical Practice in Late Antiquity". In Scarborough, John (ed.). Symposium on Byzantine Medicine. Dumbarton Oaks Papers. Vol. 38. Washington DC: Dumbarton Oaks. pp. 1–14. doi:10.2307/1291489. ISBN 9780884021391. JSTOR 1291489.
- Papaconstantinou, Arietta (2016). "Introduction". Conversion in Late Antiquity: Christianity, Islam, and Beyond. London: Routledge. pp. xv–xxxvii. ISBN 978-1-4094-5738-1.
- Papaioannou, Stratis, ed. (2021). The Oxford Handbook of Byzantine Literature. New York: Oxford University Press. ISBN 978-0-19-935176-3.
  - Kaldellis, Anthony. "The Reception of Classical Literature and Ancient Myth". In Papaioannou (2021), pp. 162–179.
  - Martín, Inmaculada Pérez. "Modes of Manuscript Transmission (Ninth–Fifteenth Centuries)". In Papaioannou (2021), pp. 682–706.
  - Papaioannou, Stratis (2021a). "What Is Byzantine Literature? An Introduction". In Papaioannou (2021), pp. 1–18.
- Papademetriou, Tom (1 February 2015). "The Millet System Revisited". Render unto the Sultan. Oxford: Oxford University Press. pp. 19–62. doi:10.1093/acprof:oso/9780198717898.003.0002. ISBN 978-0-19-871789-8.
- Pohl, Walter; Gantner, Clemens; Grifoni, Cinzia; Pollheimer-Mohaupt, Marianne, eds. (25 June 2018). Transformations of Romanness: Early Medieval Regions and Identities. De Gruyter. doi:10.1515/9783110598384. hdl:10278/3702393. ISBN 978-3-11-059838-4.
  - Pohl, Walter. "1 Introduction: Early medieval Romanness – a multiple identity". In Pohl et al. (2018), pp. 3-39.
  - Stouraitis, Ioannis. "Byzantine Romanness: From geopolitical to ethnic conceptions". In Pohl et al. (2018), pp. 123-39.
- ——— (2023). "The Attitude of the Roman Emperors towards Language Practices". In Mullen, Alex (ed.). Social Factors in the Latinization of the Roman West (1st ed.). Oxford: Oxford University Press. ISBN 978-0-19-888729-4.
- Salaman, Rena (1986). "The Case of the Missing Fish, or Dolmathon Prolegomena". In Jaine, Tom (ed.). Oxford Symposium on Food & Cookery 1984 & 1985: Cookery: Science, Lore & Books: Proceedings (Introduction by Alan Davidson). London: Prospect Books. pp. 184–187. ISBN 978-0-907325-16-1.
- Kazhdan, Alexander (1990). "The Notion of Byzantine Diplomacy". In Shepard, Jonathan (ed.). Byzantine Diplomacy: Papers of the Twenty-fourth Spring Symposium of Byzantine Studies. Cambridge: Variorum. pp. 3–24. ISBN 9780860783381.
- Shepard, Jonathan, ed. (2009). The Cambridge History of the Byzantine Empire c. 500–1492. Cambridge: Cambridge University Press. ISBN 978-0-5117-5670-2.
  - Angold, Michael. "Belle Époque or Crisis? (1025–1118)". In Shepard (2009), pp. 583–626.
  - Angold, Michael (2009b). "After the Fourth Crusade: the Greek Rump States and the Recovery of Byzantium". In Shepard (2009), pp. 731–758.
  - Auzépy, Marie-France. "State of Emergency (700–850)". In Shepard (2009), pp. 251–291.
  - Bryer, Anthony. "The Roman Orthodox World (1393–1492)". In Shepard (2009), pp. 465–492.
  - Kaegi, Walter Emil. "Confronting Islam: Emperors Versus Caliphs (641 – c. 850)". In Shepard (2009), pp. 365–394.
  - Laiou, Angeliki. "The Palaiologoi And The World Around Them (1261–1400)". In Shepard (2009), pp. 803–833.
  - Louth, Andrew (2009a). "Justinian and his legacy (500–600)". In Shepard (2009), pp. 97–129.
  - Louth, Andrew (2009b). "Byzantium Transforming (600–700)". In Shepard (2009), pp. 221–248.
  - Magdalino, Paul. "The Empire of the Komnenoi (1118–1204)". In Shepard (2009), pp. 627–663.
  - Moorhead, John. "Western Approaches (500–600)". In Shepard (2009).
  - Shepard, Jonathan (2009b). "Equilibrium to Expansion (886–1025)". In Shepard (2009), pp. 493–536.
  - Tougher, Shaun. "After Iconoclasm (850–886)". In Shepard (2009), pp. 292–304.
  - Whittow, Mark. "The Middle Byzantine Economy (600–1204)". In Shepard (2009), pp. 465–492.
- Stewart, Michael Edward; Parnell, David Alan; Whately, Conor, eds. (2022). The Routledge Handbook on Identity in Byzantium. The Routledge History Handbooks. New York: Routledge. ISBN 978-0-367-14341-1.
  - Stewart, Michael. "Finding Byzantium". In Stewart, Parnell & Whately (2022), pp. 1–15.
  - Muthesius, Anna. "Imperial identity: Byzantine silks, art, autocracy, theocracy, and the image of the Basileia". In Stewart, Parnell & Whately (2022), pp. 81-103.
  - Kaldellis, Anthony (2022b). "Provincial identities in Byzantium". In Stewart, Parnell & Whately (2022), pp. 248-261.
  - Goldwyn, Adam J. "Byzantium in the American Alt-Right Imagination: Paradigms of the Medieval Greek Past Among Men's Rights Activists and White Supremacists". In Stewart, Parnell & Whately (2022), pp. 424–436.
- Stolte, Bernard (2018). "Byzantine Law: The Law of the New Rome". In Pihlajamäki, Heikki; Dubber, Markus D.; Godfrey, Mark (eds.). The Oxford Handbook of European Legal History. Vol. 1. Oxford: Oxford University Press. pp. 230–249. doi:10.1093/oxfordhb/9780198785521.013.10. ISBN 9780191827426.
- Stouraitis, Yannis, ed. (31 October 2022). Identities and Ideologies in the Medieval East Roman World (1 ed.). Edinburgh University Press. doi:10.3366/edinburgh/9781474493628.001.0001. ISBN 978-1-4744-9362-8.
  - Stouraitis, Yannis (2022b). "1 Is Byzantinism an Orientalism? Reflections on Byzantium's Constructed Identities and Debated Ideologies". In Stouraitis (2022), pp. 19-47.
- Touliatos, Diane (2001). "Byzantine Secular Music". Grove Music Online. Oxford: Oxford University Press. doi:10.1093/gmo/9781561592630.article.48192. ISBN 978-1-56159-263-0. (subscription, Wikilibrary access, or UK public library membership required)
- Velimirović, Miloš (1990). "Byzantine Chant". In Crocker, Richard; Hiley, David (eds.). The New Oxford History of Music. Vol. II: The Early Middle Ages To 1300 (2nd ed.). Oxford: Oxford University Press. pp. 26–68. ISBN 978-0-19-316329-4.
- Wildberg, Christian (2018). "John Philoponus". In Zalta, Edward N. (ed.). The Stanford Encyclopedia of Philosophy (Winter 2021 ed.). Metaphysics Research Lab, Stanford University.
