= Siege of Samosata (859) =

- Part of the Arab–Byzantine wars
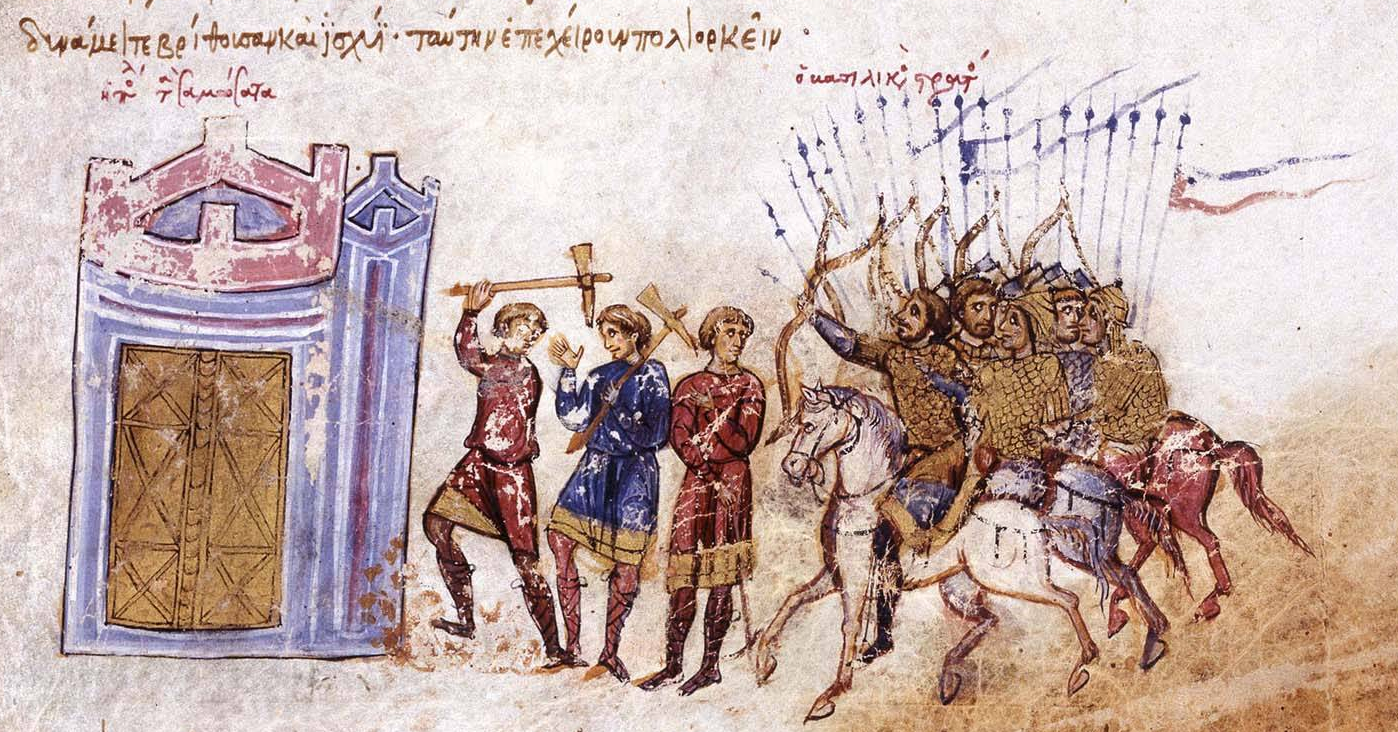
- The Byzantine army besiege Samosata in 859
Date	859
Location	Samsat, Turkey
Result	Disputed

Belligerents
Abbasid Caliphate: Emirate of Melitene; Paulician principality of Tephrike	Byzantine Empire

Strength
Unknown	Unknown

The Siege of Samosata was a military engagement between the Byzantine army and the Arab garrison of Samosata. The outcome of the battle differs between Greek sources, which portray it as a major Arab victory, and the Arabic ones, that describe it as Byzantine success. Some historians explain the differing descriptions as an attempt by later authors to blacken the image of Michael III, with his supposed defeat being fabricated.

== Background ==
During the reign of empress Theodora, she brought an end to the Byzantine Iconoclasm. A Christian sect called Paulicianism rejected image worship. Theodora issued a decree that all Paulicians should abandon the errors of their faith, but they refused. Under the orders of the empress, the Paulicians were ruthlessly suppressed; thousands were killed, crucified, or drowned. Many Paulicians escaped and found refuge on the frontier between Byzantium and the Abbasid Caliphate. Their properties were confiscated by the state. After the death of Theodora, many Paulicians sided with Arabs in their raids against Byzantium. The Arabs of Malatya allowed the Paulicians to establish their own state in Tephrike, Amara, and Arguvan.

The year 856 marked the beginning of a short but continuous period of hostilities between Umar al-Aqta of Malatya, allied with Karbeas of Tephrike, and Byzantium. In the same year, the brother of Theodora, Petronas, led a successful raid into Samosata and Amida and laid waste to Tephrike.

== Siege ==
In 859, the young Byzantine Emperor Michael III crossed the Euphrates, and set out against the city of Samosata in company of his uncle and most powerful minister Bardas. According to the Greek sources, the Byzantine army arrived and started to besiege the city. As the Arab garrison feigned cowardice and never dared to show themselves on the walls to feign cowardice, the Byzantines grew less cautious of any attack. On the third day of the siege, a Sunday, while the emperor and soldiers were attending worship and preparing for communion, the Arabs opened the gates and launched a sortie against all sides, completely catching the Byzantines off guard. The army was thrown into disorganized retreat. The Emperor managed to flee with great difficulty. The Byzantine camp was captured and looted. Many Byzantine soldiers were killed and captured. The Paulician leader Karbeas supposedly showed great valor during the battle, capturing 100 officers, most of whom were ransomed.

However, al-Tabari does not mention a Byzantine defeat, but rather describes the Emperor successfully raiding Samosata, and taking 500 prisoners. Vasiliev argued that it was odd for the Arabic sources not to mention a grave defeat they supposedly inflicted upon the Byzantines, and suggests that the basis of the Greek account was, at most, an insignificant incident that had been exaggerated by later sources, and that the Emperor in fact returned home victorious. Other historians have argued similar, with the "slanderous" (Note: Vasiliev p. 235 describes the supposed defeat as part of "des inventions calomnieuses", while Grégoire p. 37 calls it "pure calomnie".) Greek sources seeking to defame the image of the young Emperor. These histories were written at the court of the Macedonian dynasty, which descends from Emperor Basil I, who came to the throne by murdering Michael III, and therefore had reason to blacken the image of the latter, to legitimize the elevation of their ancestor. This explanation is followed by a number of modern historians, which therefore describe the campaign as Byzantine victory.

== Bibliography ==
- Bury, John (1912). A History of the Eastern Roman Empire from the Fall of Irene to the Accession of Basil I. (A. D. 802–867).
- Dixon, Paul (2022), The Paulicians, Heresy, Persecution and Warfare on the Byzantine Frontier, C.750-880, Brill, ISBN 978-9004516540.
- Grégoire, Henri (1933). "Études sur l'épopée byzantine". Revue des Études Grecques (in French). France.
- Kaldellis, Anthony (2023), The New Roman Empire: A History of Byzantium, Oxford University Press, ISBN 978-0197549322.
- Pinakoulias, Ilias (2022). Michael III: a misinterpreted emperor (PhD thesis). University of Ioannina. doi:10.12681/eadd/50988.
- Tougher, Shaun (2010). "After Iconoclasm (850–886)". In Shepard, Jonathan (ed.). The Cambridge History of the Byzantine Empire c.500–1492. Book Publishers. pp. 292–304. ISBN 978-0521832311.
- Vasiliev, Alexander (1935), Byzance et les Arabes. Tome I, La dynastie d'Amorium (820-867).
- Wortley, John (2010), John Skylitzes: A Synopsis of Byzantine History, 811–1057, Cambridge University Press, ISBN 978-0521767057.
