= Anarchism in Armenia =

Anarchism in Armenia emerged as part of the Armenian national liberation movement, with its roots in various heretical Christian sects that practiced in the region. It took on an organized form with the establishment of the Armenian Revolutionary Federation in 1890, before being suppressed by the various empires and authoritarian regimes that ruled over Armenia during the 20th century. It eventually re-emerged in the 21st century, as part of the anti-establishment movement that spread throughout the country in the wake of its independence.

== History ==
=== Christianity in Medieval Armenia ===
Until the 3rd century, Armenia was predominantly Zoroastrian, as the ruling Arsacid dynasty had itself been founded by a Zoroastrian priest. Christianity was first brought to Armenia by early Christians fleeing persecution. Monastic communities like Geghard were established by these Christians, who found safe haven in the mountains. But these first Armenian Christians were also persecuted by the Arsacids. This was until 301, when the Kingdom of Armenia became the first country to convert to Christianity, in a process spearheaded by Gregory the Illuminator.

The establishment of the Armenian Apostolic Church as the institutional arm of the new state religion and the construction of the feudal Nakharar system began to concentrate vast amounts of territory in the hands of the clergy and the nobility. As Armenian peasants were subjected to increasingly restricted conditions, there were a number of anti-feudal uprisings by dissident Christian movements in the country, particularly the Borborites, Messalians, Paulicianists and Tondrakians.

With the peace of Acilisene, Western Armenia was conquered by the Byzantine Empire in 387. Eastern Armenia remained an independent kingdom until 428, when the local nobility overthrew king Artaxias IV and the Sasanian Empire installed Veh Mihr Shapur in his place as governor. The nakharars saw their feudal power restricted in Western Armenia, leading to an insurrection against the Byzantine empire. In the East they mostly maintained their rights, until Peroz I attempted to forcibly reconvert the country to Zoroastrianism. This ignited a guerilla war against Sassanid rule, led by Vartan Mamikonian, resulting in the successful ratification of the treaty of Nvarsak, which granted greater autonomy to the nakharar.

==== The Paulicians ====
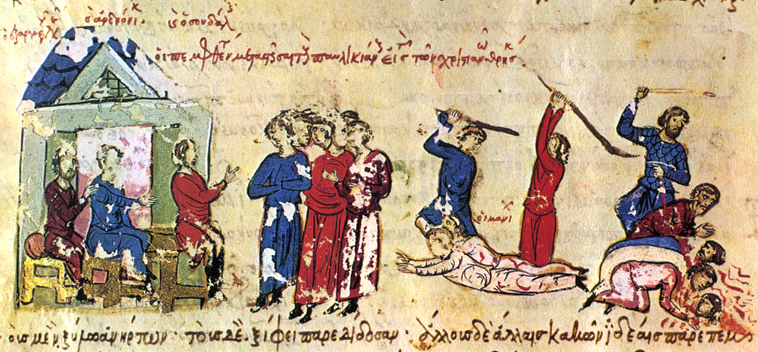
The massacre of the Paulicians in 843/844.

Shortly after the Muslim conquest of Armenia, Constantine-Silvanus was inspired by the gospel and Pauline epistles to found the Paulician movement, an adoptionist Christian sect that rejected feudal land-ownership, social inequality and the superstitions of the church. From 660, workers, low clergy and smallholders throughout Armenia began to convert to Paulician Christianity. But in 687, Silvanus was arrested by imperial authorities, tried for heresy and stoned to death. The sect continued to grow in Armenian communities throughout the Byzantine Empire, but in the early 9th century they became subject to persecution by the empire. By 843, over 100,000 Paulicians lost their lives and all of their property and lands were confiscated by the empire. The Paulicians then fled to the Emirate of Armenia, where they built the cities of Amara and Tephrike, establishing an independent Paulician territory. However, their power was finally broken at the Battle of Bathys Ryax, where they experienced heavy casualties. Many of the remaining Paulicians were resettled in Thrace, where their ideas spread across the Balkans and into Europe, influencing the formation of Bogomilism and Catharism. Others fled east to Arminiya, where the movement evolved into Tondrakianism.

==== The Tondrakians and Armenian peasant revolts ====
In 884, the Emirate of Armenia was disestablished after a successful revolt by Ashot I, who established the independent kingdom of Bagratid Armenia. This allowed for the reinstitution of the feudal Nakharar system and led to the founding of several other Armenian kingdoms and principalities, each with their own feudal hierarchies. Peasants (known as ramiks) formed the lowest class in the economic stratum and largely busied themselves with raising livestock and farming. Many of them did not own land, and lived as tenants and worked as hired hands or even slaves on the lands owned by wealthy feudal magnates. Peasants were forced to pay heavy taxes to the government and the Armenian Apostolic Church in addition to their feudal lords.

These tensions ultimately culminated in a series of peasant revolts against these new feudal lords and landowners, particularly in Ayrarat and Syunik. These revolts were supported by the Tondrakians, an anti-feudal, heretical Christian sect that had emerged from Paulicianism. They advocated for the abolition of the Church and feudalism, instead supporting the property rights of peasants and equality between men and women. This attracted many of the Armenian lower classes to join the sect, forming their own communities along Tondrakian principles.

The peasant struggle eventually evolved into outright insurrection. When the feudal Tatev Monastery took possession of its surrounding land and villages, the local peasants protested against it, leading to an open revolt against the feudal clergy. In 990, the revolt was put down by the King of Syunik, who razed the peasants' villages and dispersed its population throughout the country. After the suppression of the revolts, the Tondrakians suffered a brief decline, before experiencing a resurgence at the beginning of the 11th century. Tondrakian communities spread throughout Armenia, worrying the various rulers of the country. They experienced another brief resurgence following the fall of the Bagratid state, but were eventually eliminated by the Byzantines.

Armenia was subsequently ruled by a series of foreign powers, eventually leading to another partition of the country. In the 16th century, Western Armenia fell under the rule of the Ottoman Empire and Eastern Armenia became part of the Safavid Empire.

=== The Armenian Enlightenment ===
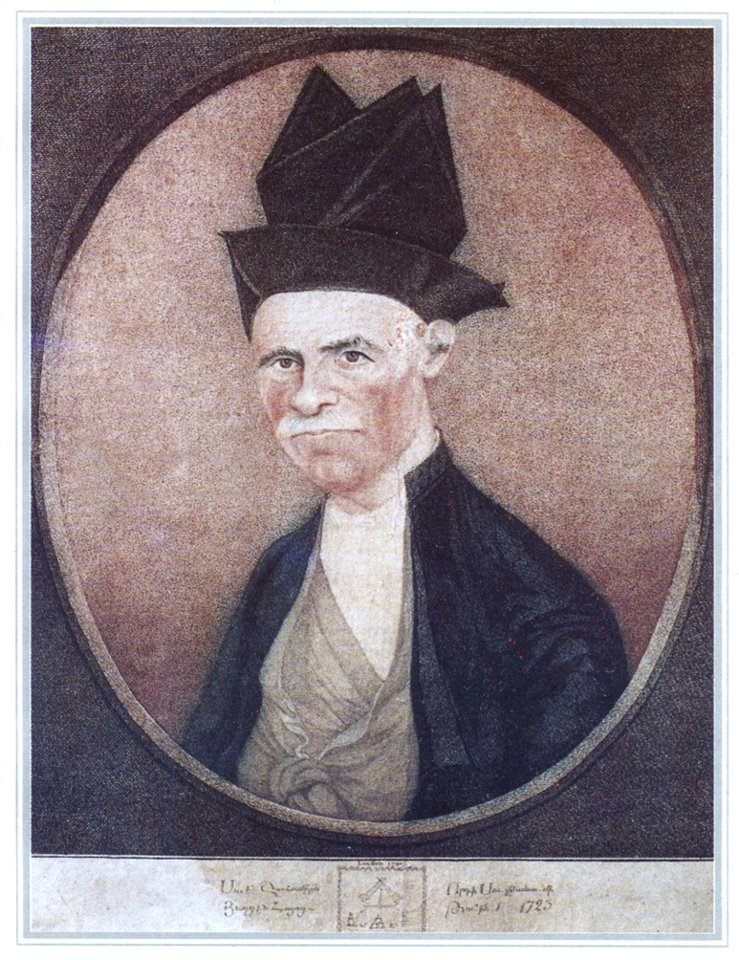
Shahamir Shahamirian, one of the early philosophers of the Armenian national awakening.

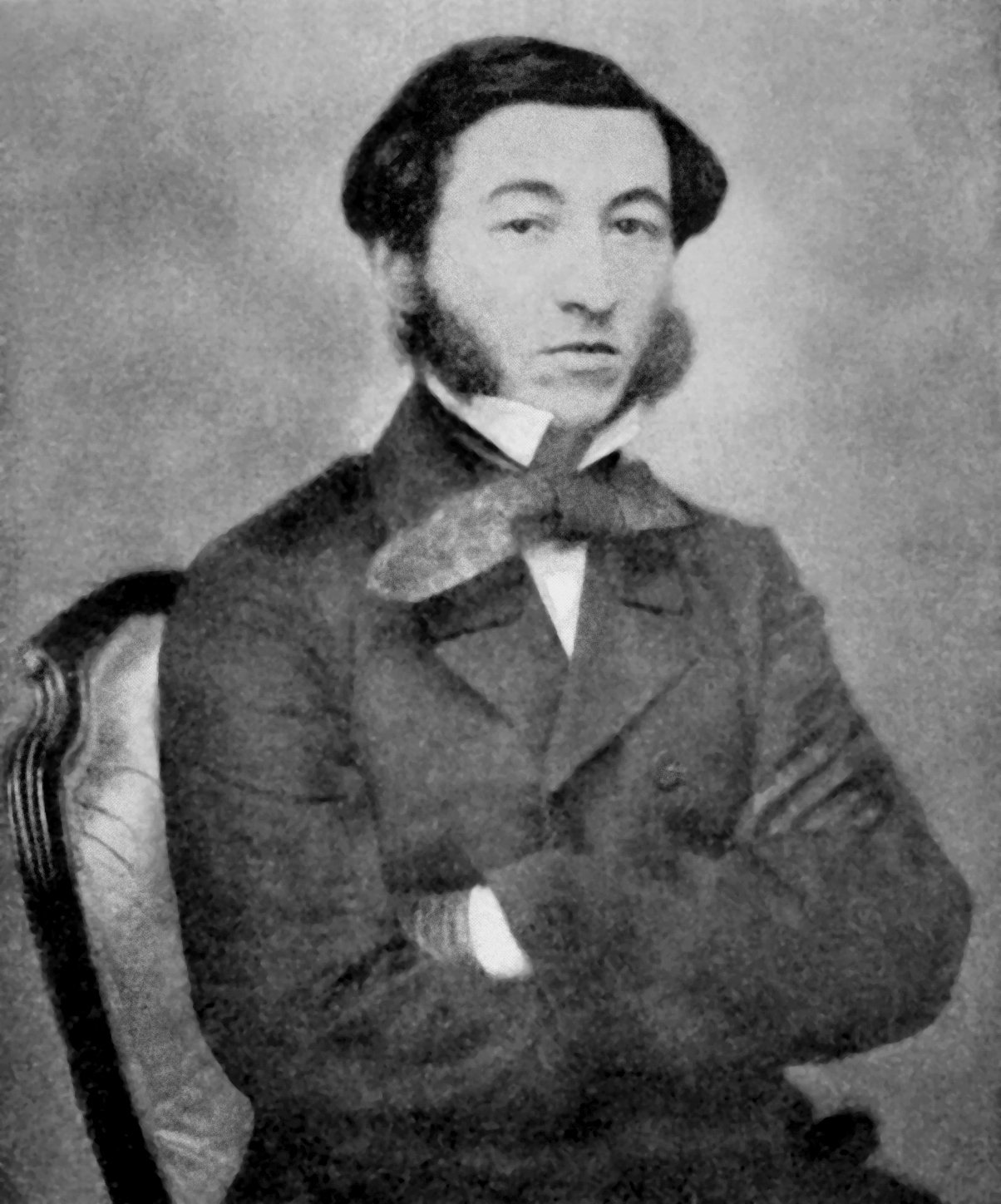
Mikayel Nalbandian, an Armenian revolutionary that inspired the beginning of the Armenian national liberation movement.

In the late 17th century, the Age of Enlightenment took hold in Eastern Armenia, with intellectuals spreading anti-feudal, democratic and revolutionary ideologies throughout the country. The most notable of these figures was Shahamir Shahamirian, a philosopher who rejected the monarchical order, considering obedience to rulers to be an insult to human intelligence. Instead he wanted to create a secular democratic system in Armenia, where all official posts (including the judiciary) were freely elected by popular vote. He wrote about his ideas of an independent Armenian nation in the book Snare of Glory:

Every human being, whether Armenian or of some other race, whether man or woman, born in Armenia or brought there from another country, shall live in equality and shall be free in all their occupations. Nobody shall have the right to enslave another person and workers should be paid like in any other kind of job, as is laid down in Armenian legislation.

After the Qajar defeat in the Russo-Persian War, Eastern Armenia was annexed into the Russian Empire and the Armenian national liberation movement began to forge ties with the nascent Russian Revolutionary movement. An influential figure during this period was Mikayel Nalbandian, an advocate of secularism and a vocal critic of the Armenian Apostolic Church. Nalbandian became known for his efforts to create national literature, written in the modern Armenian language, which would reflect the social aspirations of the Armenian people. He was also a staunch advocate of land reform, arguing that "only the equal distribution of land could bring prosperity and happiness to the people." His work also indirectly inspired an uprising in Western Armenia, which successfully forced Ottoman forces to withdraw from the region of Zeitun. During his travels throughout Europe, he became an associate of the Russian anarchist Mikhail Bakunin, the anti-serfdom activist Nikolay Ogarev and the "father of Russian socialism" Alexander Herzen, with whom he participated in the foundation of the revolutionary organization Land and Liberty and organized the distribution of the Kolokol. In 1862, Nalbandian returned to Petrograd, where he participated in the activities of Land and Liberty, before being arrested for inciting anti-Tsarist sentiment with his literature. He was subsequently exiled to Kamyshin, where he died from tuberculosis.

=== The Armenian Revolutionary Federation ===
Christapor Mikaelian, an Armenian anarchist and one of the founders of the Armenian Revolutionary Federation. In 1905, he took part in a planned assassination of Sultan Abdul Hamid II.

Inspired by Nalbandian, the Armenian anarchist Christapor Mikaelian took part in the foundation of the Armenian Revolutionary Federation (ARF), a political organization made up of a broad coalition of anarchists, socialists and nationalists. The organization itself was decentralized, allowing local branches in the various partitions of Armenia to act independently in accordance with the needs of their locality. Its goal was the establishment of a libertarian socialist society in Armenia, one based on the principles of freedom of assembly, freedom of speech, freedom of religion and agrarian reform. Mikaelian himself was a former supporter of Bakunin and defended the ideas of direct action and self-government, encouraging the ARF to put these principles into practice in their activities.

The ARF became a major political force in Armenian life. It was especially active in the Ottoman Empire, where it organized or participated in many revolutionary activities. The influence of the ARF led to the widespread adoption of anarchist ideals among Armenians in the empire, with roughly 70% of Ottoman state surveillance reports on the anarchist movement concentrating on the Armenians. In 1894, the ARF took part in the Sasun Resistance, supplying arms to the local population to help the people of Sasun defend themselves against the Hamidian purges. It was around this time that the Armenian anarcho-communist Alexander Atabekian formed ties with the organization, publishing articles about the ARF's resistance to Ottoman persecution in the Armenian language anarchist periodical Hamayankh.

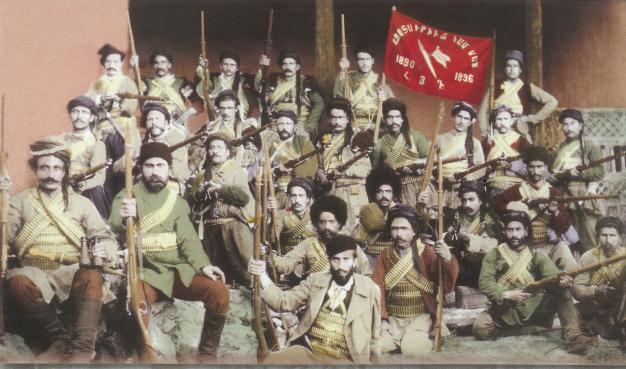
Fedayi group fighting under the ARF banner. Text in Armenian reads Azatutyun kam Mah (Liberty or Death)

To raise awareness of the massacres of 1895–96, members of the ARF led by Papken Siuni, occupied the Ottoman Bank on 26 August 1896. The purpose of the raid was to dictate the ARF's demands of reform in the Armenian populated areas of the Ottoman Empire and to attract European attention to their cause since the Europeans had many assets in the bank. The operation caught European attention but at the cost of more massacres by Sultan Abdul Hamid II. For his part, Alexander Atabekian attempted to raise awareness of the massacres by sending a declaration to the Socialist International, arguing that European states were directly participating in the crimes of the Sultan, and that the Armenian libertarians were declaring "the dawn of the social revolution" in response.

On 30 March 1904, the ARF played a major role in the Second Sasun Uprising. The ARF sent arms and fedayi to defend the region for the second time. Among the 500 fedayees participating in the resistance were famed figures such as Kevork Chavush, Sepasdatsi Murad and Hrayr Djoghk. Although they managed to hold off the Ottoman army for several months, despite their lack of fighters and firepower, Ottoman forces captured Sasun and massacred thousands of Armenians.

In 1905, Christapor Mikaelian and other members of the ARF planned an assassination attempt against Sultan Abdul Hamid II, in an act of propaganda of the deed. Mikaelian himself was killed in an explosion during the planning stages, and the attempt itself failed after the explosive missed its target. The Belgian anarchist Edward Joris was among those arrested and convicted for their part in the plot.

=== The Revolutionary period ===
==== The 1905 Russian Revolution ====
Though the Russian Empire was initially sympathetic towards the Armenian Revolutionary Federation, a Tsarist edict that brought all property of the Armenian Apostolic Church under imperial ownership saw resistance from the ARF, which dispatched militias and held mass demonstrations against the edict. This led the federation to entirely break ties with the Tsarist authorities, engaging in acts of terrorism against the state and establishing separate institutions in Russian Armenia.

In 1905, workers' strikes and peasant uprisings began to break out across the empire. During this period, anarcho-communist ideas spread throughout the Caucasus. Caucasian anarchists organized armed workers' detachments, expropriating land and property from the wealthy classes, while they also established agricultural communes, self-managed workers' collectives and the country's first trade unions. In November 1905, a general strike was called in Alaverdi, becoming the largest strike in the history of the Caucasus and managing to force the bosses into conceding to their workers' demands. Armenian rail workers also went on strike, seizing control of the country's entire rail network and forming armed battalions for self-defense. The Imperial Russian Army eventually intervened, putting down the Moscow uprising, which led to the collapse of the workers' movement in Armenia.

When the Armenian-Tatar massacres broke out, the ARF held the Russian authorities responsible. On 11 May 1905, the Dashnak revolutionary Drastamat Kanayan assassinated Russian governor general Mikhail Nakashidze, who was considered by the Armenian population as the main instigator of hate and confrontation between the Armenians and the Tatars.

==== The Young Turk Revolution ====
The actions of the Armenian Revolutionary Federation had gone on to inspire the Young Turks, who ignited a revolution that overthrew the absolutist regime of Abdul Hamid II, re-establishing the empire as a constitutional monarchy. This act legalized the ARF, which gained seats in the new parliament, but greater Armenian autonomy was not achieved. In 1909, an Ottoman counter-coup attempted to restore absolutist rule, carrying out a massacre in Adana which resulted in the deaths of over 20,000 Armenians. In the aftermath, the ARF cut ties with the Young Turks, leading to further division between the Turks and Armenians of the empire.

==== The Persian Constitutional Revolution ====
When a constitutionalist revolt broke out against the absolutist rule of the Qajar dynasty over Iran, the Iranian branch of the Armenian Revolutionary Federation elected to participate. The ARF contributed to the military aspect of the struggle, sending militias into Iran, led by Yeprem Khan, Arshak Gavafian and Khetcho. After the bombardment of the Majlis, the ARF militias rallied together with the Persian revolutionaries, eventually managing to depose Mohammad Ali Shah Qajar and re-establish the constitution.

=== World War I and the Armenian genocide ===
In 1914, the Ottoman Empire joined the Central Powers, formally entering into World War I with a surprise attack on Russian positions in the Black Sea. During its invasion into Russian and Iranian territories, the Ottomans carried out massacres on the local Armenian populations, escalating the violence into a genocide that ultimately resulted in the deaths of an estimated 1 million Armenians. Many of the leading figures in the Armenian Revolutionary Federation were among those that were deported and murdered by the Ottoman authorities on April 24, 1915. This led the ARF to coordinate the Armenian resistance, which had its epicenter in the city of Van, where tens of thousands of Armenians successfully resisted the genocidal ambitions of the local Ottoman authorities. When the war drew to a close, many members of the Young Turks movement were assassinated by the ARF during Operation Nemesis.

=== The Armenian Republic ===
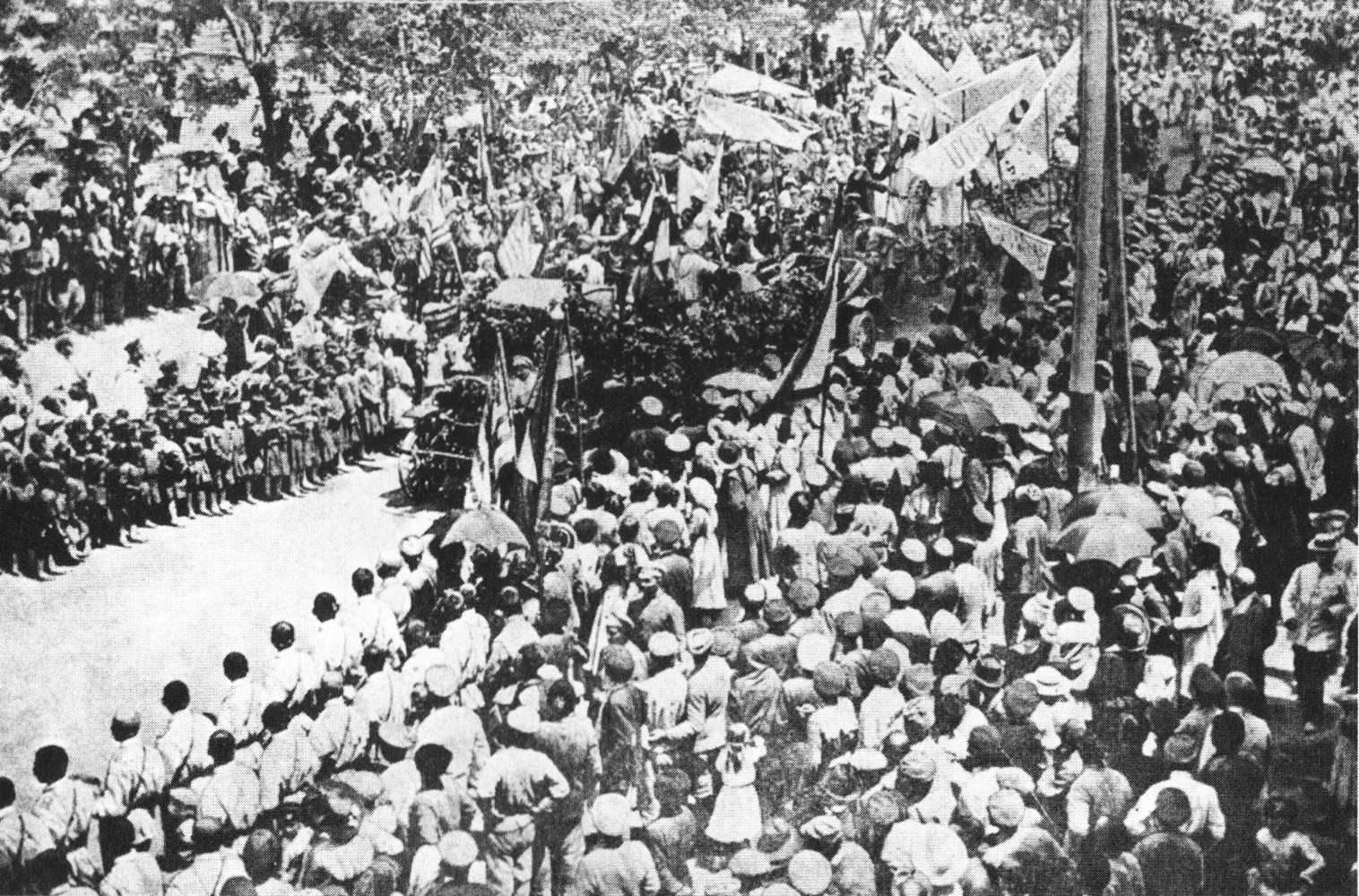
A celebration in Yerevan on May 28, 1919.

After the disintegration of the Russian Empire during World War I and the subsequent rise to power of the Bolsheviks, the treaty of Brest-Litovsk permitted the reoccupation of Western Armenia by Ottoman forces, which began to encroach on Eastern Armenian territory. The Armenian Revolutionary Federation coordinated an armed resistance to the Ottomans, which halted their advances at Sardarabad, Abaran and Karakilisa, thus securing the independence of Armenia. The Democratic Republic of Armenia was subsequently established by the ARF, which began a period of reconstruction in the country.

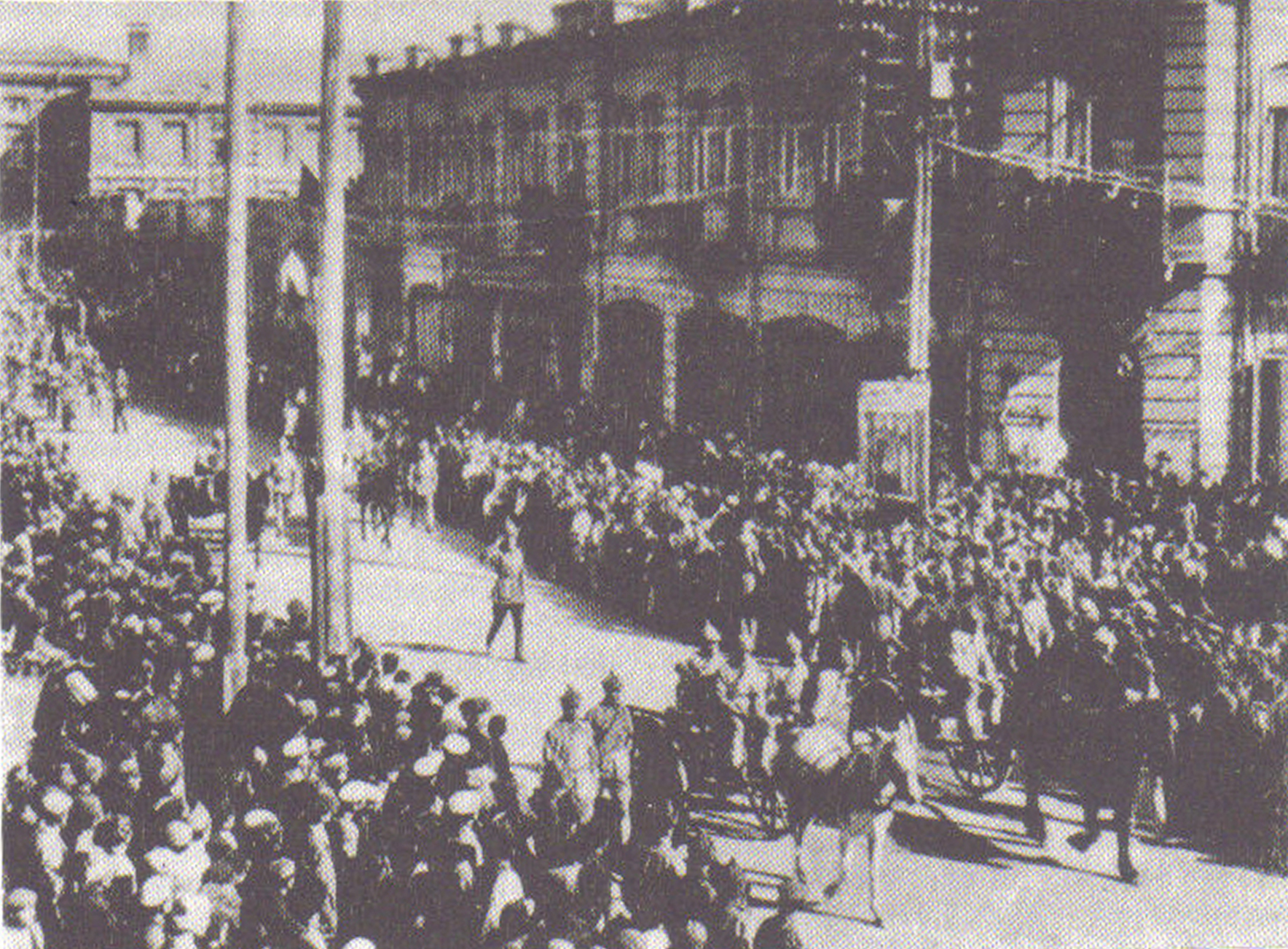
The Red Army invasion of Armenia, November 1920

But this independence was short lived, as the Russian Soviet Federative Socialist Republic formed an alliance with the newly established Republic of Turkey, with the intention of partitioning and occupying Armenia. The ensuing Turkish–Armenian War devastated the Armenian Republic, forcing it to cede Western Armenia to Turkey. Days after the signing of the Treaty of Alexandropol, the weakened republic in Eastern Armenia was invaded and occupied by the 11th Soviet Red Army, which established the Armenian Soviet Socialist Republic in its place. The Armenian Revolutionary Federation was banned by the new Bolshevik authorities, which transformed Armenia into a one-party state and brought the country under the Red Terror.

In response to the state terrorism perpetrated by the Cheka, on February 13, 1921, the ARF led an uprising against Bolshevik rule. The rebel forces managed to liberate large swathes of the country, including the capital of Yerevan, and freed many Armenian revolutionaries from prison. Battles continued to take place with the Red Army forces, which vastly outnumbered the ARF, eventually ending on April 2 with the recapture of Yerevan. The ARF retreated into the mountains of Syunik, where they proclaimed the independence of the Republic of Mountainous Armenia, at a congress held on April 26 in Tatev Monastery. The Red Army responded by conducting a massive military operation into the mountains, forcing the republic to capitulate and its leaders to flee into Iran on July 15. In exile, the last remnants of the ARF lost any trace of their anarchist and socialist ideology, moving towards an explicitly nationalist and anti-communist party line.

=== Soviet Armenia ===
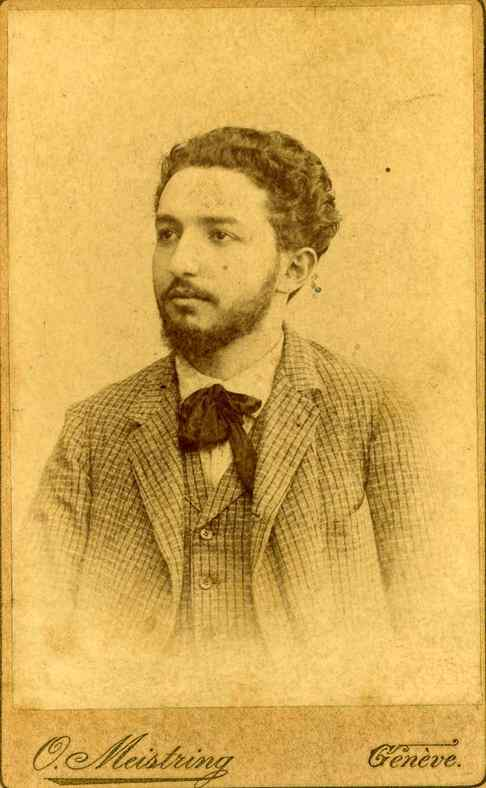
The Armenian anarcho-communist Alexander Atabekian, a contemporary of Peter Kropotkin and one of the many Armenian victims of the Great Purge.

Due to the alienation that these heavy-handed repressions had caused in Armenia, the Council of People's Commissars appointed the Armenian Bolshevik Alexander Miasnikian as Chairman of the new Armenian Soviet government, under orders to moderate government policies and slow down the transition to socialism. One of Miasnikian's first decrees as chairman was to declare Mountainous Karabakh to be a part of the Armenian SSR. Despite initially promising to integrate Nagorno-Karabakh into Armenia, the Kavbiuro reversed its promise within days, establishing the territory as an autonomous oblast of the Azerbaijan Soviet Socialist Republic. This decision was ratified by the People's Commissariat for Nationalities under Joseph Stalin, later also transferring the Nakhichevan Autonomous Soviet Socialist Republic to Azerbaijan. The Armenian Communist Party appealed this decision, as the two regions had been promised to the Armenian SSR during the Red Army invasion, but they were unsuccessful. In 1925, Miasnikian died in a plane crash under suspicious circumstances.

The Armenian SSR was thereafter brought into the Transcaucasian Socialist Federative Soviet Republic, one of the four founding republics that formed the Soviet Union. Throughout the 1920s, Armenia suffered through an anti-religious campaign during which church property was confiscated by the state and priests were harassed, briefly subsiding in order to ease relations with the Armenian diaspora. In 1928, a new phase of religious persecution accelerated again, following the consolidation of power by Stalin. This period of ideological repression in Armenia eventually evolved into targeted political repression.

Just as the Armenian SSR was reinstated by the Stalinist constitution, the country fell under the Great Purge, during which thousands of Armenians were killed. Armenian victims of the Great Purge included leaders of the clergy, prominent Bolshevik party officials (many accused of Trotskyism) and former members of the Armenian Revolutionary Federation, such as the anarchist Alexander Atabekian.

During World War II, the Soviet Union initiated a policy of population transfer of ethnic minorities. Tens of thousands of Armenians were deported to Siberia in the process, followed by the further deportation of Armenians and Hamshenis to Central Asia. Meanwhile, an estimated 300–500,000 Armenians were sent to fight on the Eastern Front, almost half of whom did not return. To revitalize the country's population, members of the Armenian diaspora were invited to repatriate the Armenian SSR, resulting in the resettlement of hundreds of thousands of Armenian immigrants throughout the country. These immigrants soon fell victim to discrimination by the native population as well as the Soviet government, which targeted many for deportation to Siberia and Central Asia. This went on until the Khrushchev Thaw, following the death of Stalin, during which the Armenian national identity was reaffirmed and the country went through a period of de-Stalinization. On April 24, 1965, demonstrations in Yerevan marked the 50th anniversary since the beginning of the Armenian genocide, beginning the first steps in the recognition of the Armenian genocide. The Armenian soviet government responded with the construction of a memorial complex on the hill of Tsitsernakaberd.

Following the introduction of glasnost and perestroika, many Hamshenis in Central Asia petitioned the government to allow their resettlement in Armenia, which the Soviet government rejected. On February 20, 1988, the Supreme Soviet of the Nagorno-Karabakh Autonomous Oblast voted to unify with Armenia, a decision that led to the beginning of the First Nagorno-Karabakh War. Escalating tensions between the Armenian SSR and the Soviet authorities culminated in a declaration of State Sovereignty by the Armenian Supreme Soviet, followed by the 1991 Armenian independence referendum, in which Armenians voted overwhelmingly in favor of independence.

=== Independent Armenia ===
Following the dissolution of the Soviet Union and the end of the First Nagorno-Karabakh War, the right-wing Republican Party of Armenia began to consolidate power as the country's ruling political party. When the republican-supported Robert Kocharyan was elected as President of Armenia, he legalized the formerly banned Armenian Revolutionary Federation, which went on to form a coalition government with the republicans following the 1999 parliamentary election. On October 27, 1999, the Armenian parliament shooting took place, in which the prime minister Vazgen Sargsyan and the speaker Karen Demirchyan were both killed in a terrorist attack led by the former ARF member Nairi Hunanyan. This event led to a rise authoritarian rule by Kocharyan and the republican party.

In the 2000s, the anarchist movement re-emerged in Armenia, rising up in reaction to the restoration of the rites of the nobility and the Apostolic Church, as well as the resurgence of authoritarian governance. In 2003, a branch of Autonomous Action was established in Armenia, followed by the establishment of the Armenian Libertarian-Socialist Movement in 2007. The rise of anti-establishment sentiment culminated in the 2008 protest, in which people rose up against alleged electoral fraud after the election of Kocharyan's successor Serzh Sargsyan as president. The demonstrations were violently dispersed and a state of emergency was invoked by the republican government, banning freedom of assembly and censoring the media, accelerating the violence which resulted in the deaths of 10 protesters. Political repression in the country became so intense that many of the newly established anarchist groups were forced to dissolve themselves, including the Armenian branch of Autonomous Action, which fled into exile in Europe. Further protests in 2011 eventually provoked a number of reforms, including the reinstitution of freedom of assembly and an amnesty for political prisoners.

The anarchist movement subsequently re-organized itself, attending May Day protests as part of the "Left Alternative" organization, as well as establishing autonomous social centers such as the DIY Club in Yerevan. Animal rights activists staged "shut 'em down" events in cities throughout the country, during which meat and fur shops were closed down with glue and locks. Anarchists participated in the 2015 protests against a price hike on electricity rates, they were violently repressed by police, but nevertheless managed to achieve the reversal of the price increase and the sale of the monopolistic electricity distributor.

Anarcha-feminists responded to the 2016 Nagorno-Karabakh conflict by denouncing the nationalism which drove the conflict, arguing that the conflict was used as a distraction by the authoritarian regimes in Armenia and Azerbaijan to justify the continued oppression of their own people. They claimed that the only way to achieve peace was through the destruction of the patriarchal and militarist systems that perpetuate war, by means of non-violent methods of collective direct action. Furthermore, anarchists criticized the subsequent Yerevan hostage crisis as a product of nationalism, misogyny and statism, seeing no point in participating in the solidarity protests, instead hoping for anti-government protests to develop a distinct element of class struggle. Anarchists also described the Velvet revolution as mere "regime change", which changed little materially about the Armenian state. They analyzed how it would affect the country's alliance with Russia, as well as the potential for future clashes in Nagorno-Karabakh.

With the outbreak of the 2020 Nagorno-Karabakh war, many anarchists from Armenia, Azerbaijan and other countries unequivocally condemned the war, adopting an anti-militarist stance and calling for peace.

== See also ==
- Category:Armenian anarchists
- List of anarchist movements by region
- Anarchism in Azerbaijan
- Anarchism in Georgia
- Anarchism in Russia
- Anarchism in Turkey
