= Sergius-Tychicus =

Christian Paulician leader, fl. 801-835

Sergius, also known as Tychicus (?–835), was a religious leader of the 9th century. In 801, after joining the Astati at Argaoun (now Arguvan), he founded the Paulician Church of the Colossians. He later led a mission to Cilicia and founded the Church of the Ephesians, based in Mimistra. According to Peter the Hegoumenos, Sergius was the seventh and last leader of the Paulicians, and the successor to Baanes (or Vahan) the Filthy. The sect was suppressed in 835.

== See also ==
- Karbeas
- Chrysocheir
- Constantine-Silvanus
