= Paulician principality of Tephrike =

Medieval Armenian principality

Principality of Tephrike
- mid 9th century–870s
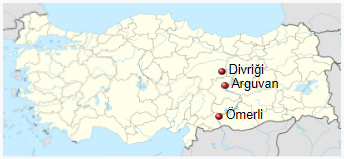
- Capital: Tephrike
- Religion: Paulicianism
- Government: Monarchy
  - 840s - 863: Karbeas
  - 863 - 870s: Chrysocheres
- History
  - Established: mid 9th century
  - Disestablished: 870s
Preceded by	Succeeded by
Emirate of Melitene	Byzantine Empire

The Principality of Tephrike was a medieval Paulician principality on the territory of historical Tephrike (present-day Divriği, Turkey).

== History ==
In 843, the Byzantine Empress Theodora instituted a major persecution against a heretical medieval Christian sect which originated in Armenia in the 7th century, the Paulicians, throughout Asia Minor. In response, under their then leader Karbeas, the Paulicians fled across the border to the areas of Armenia under Arab control.

Under the protection of Umar al-Aqta, the Emir of Melitene, the sect was permitted by the Arabs to establish an independent Paulician state centred on Tephrike on the Upper Euphrates, which also included the newly founded cities of Amara (present-day Ömerli, Turkey) and Argaoun (present-day Arguvan, Turkey). From there, he participated regularly in the raids by the Arab border emirates into Byzantine Asia Minor. Karbeas died in 863 during Michael III's campaign against the Arabs and was possibly with Umar at Malakopea before the Battle of Lalakaon.

Karbeas's successor, Chrysocheres ('the goldhand'), devastated many cities in the continued wars with the Byzantines; in 867, he advanced as far as Ephesus. Chrysocheres was killed at the Battle of Bathys Ryax in 872 or 878.

By 878, the emperor Basil I had conquered the Paulician strongholds in Asia Minor (including Tephrike) and the survivors from the destruction of the Paulician state were largely displaced.

== Sources ==
- Kiapidou, Eirini-Sofia (17 January 2003). "Battle at Bathys Ryax, 872/8". Encyclopedia of the Hellenic World, Asia Minor. Archived from the original on 21 July 2011.
- Nersessian, Vrej (1987). The Tondrakian Movement: Religious Movements in the Armenian Church from the Fourth to the Tenth Centuries. London: Kahn & Averill. ISBN 978-0-900707-92-6.
- Vasiliev, Alexander A. (1935). Byzance et les Arabes, Tome I: La dynastie d'Amorium (820–867). Corpus Bruxellense Historiae Byzantinae (in French). Vol. 1. French ed.: Henri Grégoire, Marius Canard. Brussels: Éditions de l'Institut de philologie et d'histoire orientales.
- Whittow, Mark (1996). The Making of Byzantium, 600–1025. Berkeley and Los Angeles, California: University of California Press. ISBN 978-0-520-20496-6.
