= Astati =

9th-century Christian Manichaean sect

The Astati were a Paulician sect in the 9th century, the followers of Sergius. They prevailed much under Emperor Nicephorus I, but later, under Michael I Rhangabes, they were curbed with very severe laws.
