= Peter of Sicily =

Peter of Sicily may refer to:

- Petrus Siculus (fl. 870)
- Peter I of Sicily = Peter III of Aragon (1282–1285)
- Peter II of Sicily (1305–1342)
- Peter of Aragon (heir of Sicily) (1398–1400)
