= The Key of Truth =

The Key of Truth is a text identified by Frederick Conybeare as a manual of either a Paulician or Tondrakian church in Armenia. He studied the text as manuscript dated 1782 held at the library of Ejmiacin in Armenia, and published it as an English translation in 1898.

Conybeare claimed that the text was a servicebook of the medieval Paulicians, and it contains a rite of adult baptism with water and conscious omission of Trinitarian terminology.

There is scholarly consensus that The Key of Truth was used by sectarians with beliefs derived from the Paulicians, but scholars after Conybeare consider that these beliefs may have evolved since the Middle Ages.
