= Battle of Lalakaon =

863 Byzantine victory over the Abbasids in Paphlagonia

- Part of the Arab–Byzantine wars
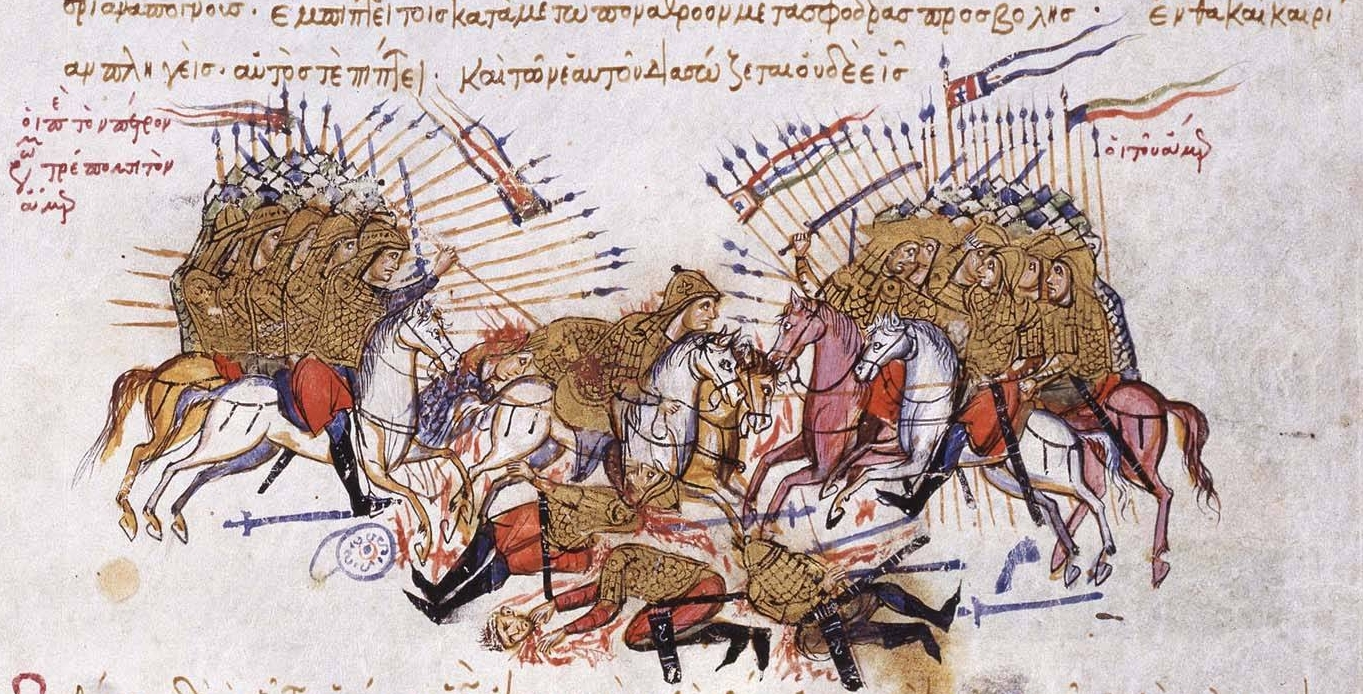
- An Arab–Byzantine battle as depicted in the 12th-century Madrid Skylitzes
Date	September 3, 863
Location	Lalakaon river, Paphlagonia, Asia Minor
Result	Byzantine victory

Belligerents
Abbasid Caliphate: Emirate of Melitene; Paulician principality of Tephrike (?)	Byzantine Empire

Commanders and leaders
Umar al-Aqta †; Karbeas † (?)	Michael III (?); Petronas; Nasar

The Battle of Lalakaon (Greek: Μάχη τοῦ Λαλακάοντος), or Battle of Poson or Porson (Μάχη τοῦ Πό(ρ)σωνος), was fought in 863 between the Byzantine Empire and an invading Arab army in Paphlagonia (modern northern Turkey). The Byzantine army was led by Petronas, the uncle of Emperor Michael III, although Arab sources also mention the presence of the Emperor in person. The Arabs were led by the emir of Melitene (Malatya), Umar al-Aqta.

Umar al-Aqta overcame initial Byzantine resistance to his invasion and reached the Black Sea. The Byzantines then mobilized their forces and encircled the Arab army near the Lalakaon river. The subsequent battle ended in a Byzantine victory and the emir's death on the field, and was followed by a successful Byzantine counteroffensive across the border. These victories were decisive; the main threats to the Byzantine borderlands were eliminated, and the era of Byzantine ascendancy in the East (culminating in the 10th-century conquests) began.

The Byzantine success had another corollary: removing the constant Arab pressure on the eastern frontier allowed the Byzantine government to concentrate on affairs in Europe, particularly in neighboring Bulgaria. The Bulgarians were pressured into accepting Byzantine Christianity, beginning their absorption into the Byzantine cultural sphere.

== Background: Arab–Byzantine border wars ==
After the rapid Muslim conquests of the 7th century, the Byzantine Empire was confined to Asia Minor, the southern Balkans, and parts of Italy. As Byzantium remained the major Christian enemy of the early caliphates, Arab raids into Asia Minor continued throughout the 8th and 9th centuries. These expeditions were launched almost annually from bases in the Arab frontier zone, and acquired a quasi-ritualistic character as part of the Muslim jihad (holy war).

The Byzantines were generally on the defensive during the 7th–9th centuries, and suffered some catastrophic defeats, such as the razing of Amorium (home city of the reigning Amorian dynasty) in 838. With the waning of the military threat posed by the Abbasid Caliphate after 842, and the rise of semi-independent Arab emirates along the eastern Byzantine frontier, the Byzantines could increasingly assert themselves.

The most significant threats to the Byzantine Empire during the 850s were the emirate of Melitene (Malatya) under Umar al-Aqta (r. 830s–863); the Abbasid frontier district of Tarsus, commanded by Ali ibn Yahya al-Armani; the emirate of Qaliqala (Byzantine Theodosiopolis, modern Erzurum); and the Paulician principality of Tephrike, led by Karbeas. Melitene in particular was a major concern as its location on the western side of the Anti-Taurus range allowed direct access to the Anatolian plateau. An indication of the threat posed by these lordships came in 860, when they combined to disastrous effect for the Byzantines. Umar and Karbeas raided deep into Asia Minor, returning with substantial plunder. This was followed shortly afterwards by a raid by the forces of Tarsus under Ali al-Armani. Finally, an Arab naval attack from Syria sacked Attaleia, capital of the Cibyrrhaeot Theme.

== Arab invasion of 863 ==
Map of Byzantine Asia Minor and the Arab–Byzantine frontier region in the middle of the 9th century.

Umar struck again during the summer of 863, joining forces with Abbasid general Ja'far ibn Dinar al-Khayyat for a successful raid into Cappadocia. The Arabs crossed the Cilician Gates into Byzantine territory, plundering as they went, until they neared Tyana. Ja'far's army returned home, but Umar obtained Ja'far's permission to press on into Asia Minor. Umar's forces were the greater part of his emirate's strength, but their exact size is uncertain. The contemporary Muslim historian Ya'qubi writes that Umar had 8,000 men at his disposal, but the 10th-century Byzantine historians Genesius and Theophanes Continuatus inflate the Arab army to 40,000 men. According to the Byzantinist John Haldon, the former number was closer to reality; Haldon estimates the combined Arab forces at 15,000–20,000 men. Modern historians consider it likely that a Paulician contingent under Karbeas was also present, although this is not explicitly attested.

Emperor Michael III (r. 842–867) assembled his army to counter the Arab raid, and met them in battle at an area known in Arab sources as Marj al-Usquf ('Bishop's Meadow'): a highland near Malakopeia, north of Nazianzus. The battle was bloody, with heavy casualties on both sides. According to the contemporary historian al-Tabari, who served as an Abbasid official in Baghdad, only 1,000 soldiers of Umar's army survived. Nevertheless, the Arabs escaped the Byzantines and continued their raid north into the Armeniac Theme, reaching the Black Sea and sacking the port city of Amisos. Byzantine historians report that Umar, enraged that the sea blocked his advance, ordered it to be lashed, but modern scholars consider this account was most likely inspired by a similar story about Xerxes during the Greco-Persian Wars.

== Battle ==
When Michael learned of the fall of Amisos, he assembled a huge force—al-Tabari claims 50,000 men—under his uncle Petronas, who held the post of Domestic of the Schools (commander-in-chief of the Byzantine field army) and Nasar, the strategos (military governor) of the Bucellarian Theme. According to al-Tabari, the Emperor commanded these forces in person, but this is not supported by Byzantine sources. Given the bias against Michael by historians writing during the subsequent Macedonian dynasty, the omission may be deliberate. Byzantine armies, assembled from both Asian and European provinces of the empire, converged on the Arabs from three directions: a northern army made up of forces from the northeastern themes of the Armeniacs, Bucellarians, Koloneia, and Paphlagonia; a southern force (probably the one which fought at Bishop's Meadow and had since shadowed the Arab army) from the Anatolic, Opsician, and Cappadocian themes and the kleisourai (frontier districts) of Seleukeia and Charsianon; and a western force under Petronas with men from the Macedonian, Thracian, and Thracesian themes and the imperial tagmata (standing regiments) from the capital.

Despite the difficulty of coordinating these widely separated forces, the Byzantine armies met on September 2 and surrounded Umar's smaller army at a location described as Poson (Πόσων) or Porson (Πόρσων) near the Lalakaon River. The exact location of the river and the battle site have not been identified, but most scholars agree that they were near the Halys River, about 130 kilometres (80 mi) southeast of Amisos. With the approach of the Byzantine armies, the only escape route open to the Emir and his men was dominated by a strategically located hill. Both sides tried to occupy it during the night, but the Byzantines were successful. The following day, Umar threw his entire force towards the west, where Petronas was located, in an attempt at a breakthrough. Petronas' men stood firm, giving the other two Byzantine armies time to close in and attack the Arab army's exposed rear and flanks. The rout was complete, with most of the Arab army, and Umar, falling in battle. Casualties may have included the Paulician leader Karbeas; although his participation in the battle is uncertain, it is recorded that he died that year.

Only the emir's son, leading a small force, escaped the battlefield, fleeing south towards the border area of Charsianon. Pursued by the local kleisourarches (frontier district commander), Machairas, he was defeated and captured along with many of his men.

== Aftermath ==
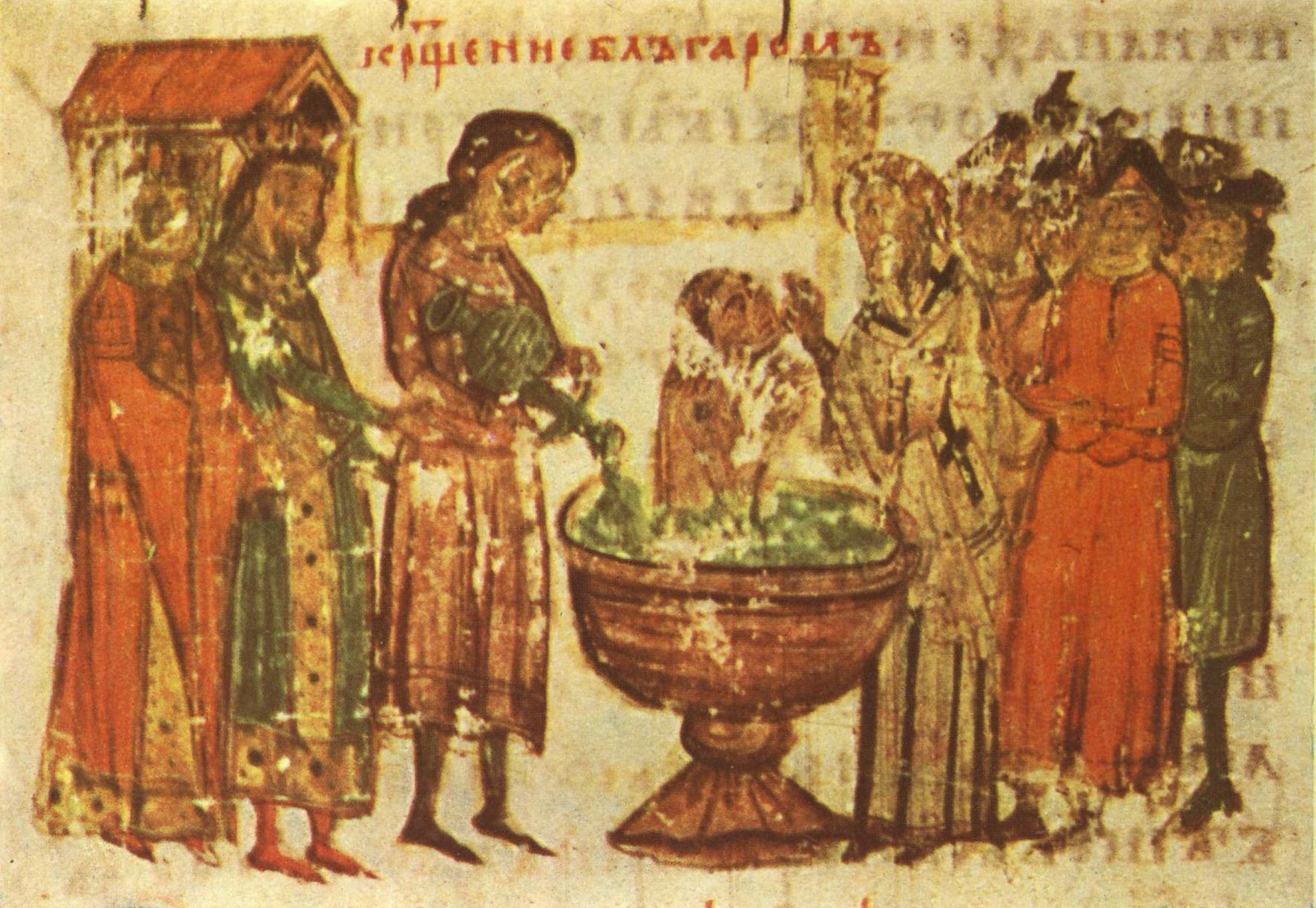
The success of the Battle of Lalakaon and its follow-up operations enabled the Byzantine Empire to focus its might against Bulgaria, leading to its successful Christianization. Depiction of the baptism of the Bulgarians from a 14th-century copy of the Manasses Chronicle.

The Byzantines moved quickly to take advantage of their victory. A Byzantine army invaded Arab-held Armenia and, sometime in October or November, defeated and killed its governor, Ali al-Armani. In a single campaigning season, the Byzantines thus eliminated the three most dangerous opponents on their eastern border. These successes were decisive, permanently destroying the power of Melitene. The Byzantine victory at Lalakaon altered the strategic balance in the region and marked the beginning of Byzantium's century-long offensive in the East.

The importance of these victories did not go unnoticed at the time. The Byzantines hailed them as revenge for the sack of Amorium 25 years earlier, the victorious generals were granted a triumphal entry into Constantinople, and special celebrations and services were held. Petronas received the exalted court title of magistros, and the kleisoura of Charsianon was raised to the status of a full theme. Al-Tabari reports that the news of the deaths of Umar and Ali al-Armani—"strong defenders of Islam, men of great courage who elicited enormous praise among the frontier districts where they served"—provoked an outpouring of grief in Baghdad and other cities, culminating in riots and looting. Although private donations and volunteers for the holy war began to gather at the border, "the central authorities [were not] prepared to send a military force against the Byzantines on their own account in those days" because of ongoing internal turmoil in the Abbasid Caliphate.

The removal of the eastern threat and increasing Byzantine confidence also opened up opportunities in the west, where the Bulgarian ruler Boris (r. 852–889) had been negotiating with the Pope and Louis the German (r. 817–876) for the conversion of himself and his people to Christianity. The Byzantine government was not prepared to tolerate the potential expansion of the Pope's influence to Constantinople's doorstep. The victorious eastern armies were transferred to Europe and invaded Bulgaria in 864, a demonstration of military might which convinced its ruler to accept Byzantine missionaries instead. Boris was baptized—taking the name Michael in honor of the Byzantine emperor—beginning the Christianization of Bulgaria and his nation's absorption into the Byzantine-influenced Eastern Christian world.

== Influence on heroic poetry ==
According to the French Byzantinist Henri Grégoire, the Byzantine successes against the Arabs, which culminated in the Battle of Lalakaon, inspired one of the oldest surviving acritic (heroic) poems: the Song of Armouris. According to Grégoire, the eponymous protagonist (the young Byzantine warrior Armouris) was inspired by Emperor Michael III. A battle in the Byzantine epic cycle around Digenis Akritas is also reminiscent of the events at Lalakaon, as the eponymous hero surrounds an Arab army near Malakopeia. Strong influences can also be found in episodes of the Arab, and later Turkish, epics about Battal Ghazi and in an episode in One Thousand and One Nights.

== Sources ==
- Beck, Hans Georg (1971). Geschichte der byzantinischen Volksliteratur [History of the Byzantine Folk Literature] (in German). Munich: Verlag C. H. Beck. ISBN 3-406-01420-8.
- El-Cheikh, Nadia Maria (2004). Byzantium Viewed by the Arabs. Cambridge, Massachusetts: Harvard Center for Middle Eastern Studies. ISBN 0-932885-30-6.
- Haldon, John (2001). The Byzantine Wars: Battles and Campaigns of the Byzantine Era. Stroud, Gloucestershire: Tempus. ISBN 0-7524-1795-9.
- Huxley, George L. (1975). "The Emperor Michael III and the Battle of Bishop's Meadow (A.D. 863)" (PDF). Greek, Roman, and Byzantine Studies (16). Durham, North Carolina: Duke University: 443–450. ISSN 0017-3916. Archived from the original (PDF) on February 6, 2007.
- Jenkins, Romilly (1987). Byzantium: The Imperial Centuries, AD 610–1071. Toronto: University of Toronto Press. ISBN 0-8020-6667-4.
- Kiapidou, Eirini-Sofia (January 17, 2003). "Battle of Lalakaon River, 863". Encyclopedia of the Hellenic World, Asia Minor. Athens: Foundation of the Hellenic World. Archived from the original on July 21, 2011.
- Saliba, George, ed. (1985). The History of al-Ṭabarī, Volume XXXV: The Crisis of the ʿAbbāsid Caliphate: The Caliphates of al-Mustaʿīn and al-Muʿtazz, A.D. 862–869/A.H. 248–255. SUNY Series in Near Eastern Studies. Albany, New York: State University of New York Press. ISBN 978-0-87395-883-7.
- Treadgold, Warren (1997). A History of the Byzantine State and Society. Stanford, California: Stanford University Press. ISBN 0-8047-2630-2.
- Vasiliev, Alexander A. (1935). Byzance et les Arabes, Tome I: La dynastie d'Amorium (820–867). Corpus Bruxellense Historiae Byzantinae (in French). Vol. 1. French ed.: Henri Grégoire, Marius Canard. Brussels: Éditions de l'Institut de philologie et d'histoire orientales.
- Whittow, Mark (1996). The Making of Byzantium, 600–1025. Berkeley and Los Angeles, California: University of California Press. ISBN 978-0-520-20496-6.
