= Tondrakians =

The Tondrakians (Old Armenian: թոնդրակեցիք, romanized: tʻondraketsʻikʻ) (Note: Plural of tʻondraketsʻi 'of Tondrak, a person from Tondrak'. Also աղանդ թոնդրակեցւոց aghand tʻondraketsʻwotsʻ 'Tondrakian sect'. In Modern Armenian: թոնդրակյաններ tʻondrakyanner, Թոնդրակյան շարժում Tʻondrakyan sharzhum 'Tondrakian movement') were members of an anti-feudal Christian sect that flourished in medieval Armenia between the early 9th and the 11th century, centered on the district of Tondrak north of Lake Van.

Historians disagree about its nature. Soviet Armenian scholars (Ashot Hovhannisyan, Stepan Melik-Bakhshyan, Suren Poghosyan, Babken Arakelyan) generally treated it as an anti-feudal peasant uprising, with religion serving as the outward form of social protest. Other scholars (Malachia Ormanian, Karapet Ter-Mkrtchyan, Nerses Akinian, Frederick Conybeare, Nina Garsoïan, Vrej Nersessian) place the emphasis on its religious content, tracing it to early adoptionist Christology and to the Messalian and Paulician currents present in Armenia between the 4th and 9th centuries.

The movement spread through Turuberan, Ayrarat, Vaspurakan, Mokk, Syunik, Upper Armenia, Shirak and Caucasian Albania and drew in peasants, urban artisans, monks, bishops, princes and noblewomen. Its followers upheld peasant property rights and equality between men and women. In 1050–1054 the Byzantine governor Grigor Magistros Pahlavuni destroyed its main centers through military campaigns and deportations. Small clandestine communities nevertheless survived in Armenia until the 19th century, and the deported groups in the Byzantine Empire and the Balkans are thought to have contributed to the spread of the Bogomils and related movements in Europe.

== Name ==
The name comes from Tondrak, a settlement on the slope of Mount Tondrak in the Apahunik canton of Turuberan. In the 830s and 840s it was the base of the movement's founder, Smbat Zarehavantsi.

== Primary sources ==
The Tondrakians' own writings and liturgical books were largely destroyed by church and secular authorities in the Middle Ages. The history of the movement is therefore known mainly from hostile Orthodox writers. These authors often applied to the new sect the names of heresies already condemned by councils, such as Manichaeism, Marcionism, Montanism and Simonianism, which allowed the authorities to prosecute its members under existing law and to discredit them among believers.

The main sources are:

1. Anania Narekatsi (10th century) wrote a treatise against the Tondrakians in the 950s at the request of Catholicos Ananias I of Moks. It has not survived in full, but its main arguments are preserved in the works of his disciples, the historian Ukhtanes and Gregory of Narek.
2. Gregory of Narek (951–1003) wrote the epistle "To the Eminent and Great Monastery of Kchav, Concerning the Beliefs of the Accursed Tondrakians", preserved in The Book of Letters. It is a major source for Tondrakian doctrine. The abbot of Kchav in Mokk had joined Mushegh, a sectarian already condemned by Anania of Narek, and Gregory listed and refuted the teachings of Smbat Zarehavantsi and his followers point by point.
3. Grigor Magistros Pahlavuni (c. 990–1058) described the origins of the movement, its leaders, its geography and the persecutions of the 1050s in his letters, including those to the Jacobite Patriarch of Syria and to the Tondrakians of Tulayl.
4. Aristakes Lastivertsi (11th century) describes Tondrakian activity in Hark and Mananaghi in the early 11th century in chapters 22 and 23 of his History.
5. Stepanos Orbelian (13th century), Matthew of Edessa (12th century) and Samuel of Ani (12th century) record anti-church movements in Syunik (Tsuraberd) and Shirak (Shirakavan, Ani) and their suppression.
6. Poghos Taronatsi (d. 1123) and Nerses Shnorhali (1102–1173) mention the survival of the movement in the 11th–12th centuries and its contacts with the Arewordik.
7. The Key of Truth is a manuscript copied in Taron in 1782 and confiscated in 1837 in the Shirak district by the Synod of the Armenian Church (Matenadaran, MS no. 6710). Frederick Conybeare published it in Oxford in 1898 with an English translation and a long introduction.

== Background ==
=== Early Christian currents in Armenia ===
The movement is usually studied against the background of non-orthodox Christian currents present in Armenia from the 4th century. Christianity reached Armenia from two directions, Greek (Cappadocia, Caesarea) and Syriac (Edessa, Nisibis). Early Syriac Christianity had strong ascetic, charismatic and adoptionist features, which later came to be seen as deviations as the state church and Hellenistic theology became established.

The first such current was Messalianism (Armenian: Մծղնեություն). The Council of Shahapivan in 443 adopted canons against it (canons 19 and 20). The Messalians held that baptism and church rites could not remove the original sin dwelling in a person, and that the Holy Spirit was received only through constant personal prayer and asceticism. Armenian sources (Faustus of Byzantium, Ghazar Parpetsi, Koryun, Eznik of Kolb) also mention the Borborites and the Marcionites.

=== Paulicians and Tondrakians ===
The Paulicians were active in Armenia and the eastern Byzantine provinces from the 6th to the 9th century. The earliest firm Armenian reference to them is the "Pact of Union" of the 555 Second Council of Dvin. The most substantial texts against them are Catholicos Hovhan Odznetsi's oration Against the Paulicians (717–728) and canon 32 of the Council of Dvin of 719.

Scholars disagree on how the two movements are related.

- Some identify the Tondrakians with the Paulicians or see direct continuity. Grigor Magistros and Poghos Taronatsi call the Tondrakians "Paulicians" infected by the remnants of those persecuted by Hovhan Odznetsi. Ormanian, Conybeare, Garsoïan and Nersessian share this view and point to a common adoptionist and anti-sacramental theology.
- Others distinguish them. Ter-Mkrtchyan, Bartikyan and Lemerle argued that the Paulicians, especially after the reforms of Sergius-Tychicus in the 9th century, were dualists, while the Tondrakians were a later and separate movement with a social and rationalist character.

After Byzantine forces under Basil I took the Paulician capital Tephrike in 872 and killed their leader Chrysocheir, many Paulicians moved from Western Armenia to Apahunik, Hark and Mananaghi, where they joined the Tondrakian communities founded by Smbat Zarehavantsi.

== Smbat Zarehavantsi ==
Smbat Zarehavantsi came from the village of Zarehavan in the Tsaghkotn canton of Ayrarat. Grigor Magistros dates his preaching to the time of Prince of Princes Ashot Bagratuni (later Ashot I of Armenia) or his father Smbat Ablabas, and of Catholicos Hovhannes IV Ovayetsi (833–855), that is, between the 830s and 850s. He settled in Tondrak in Apahunik, a mountainous and remote area between the Arab Qaysite emirate and Armenian princely lands, which suited an autonomous community. His activity alarmed both the Armenian princes and the Qaysite emirate. After leading the movement for decades, he was captured and executed by the emir of Manzikert, Abul Vard, who ruled in the second half of the 9th century.

=== The Persian physician ===
Gregory of Narek and Grigor Magistros say that Smbat was taught by a Persian physician and astrologer called Mdi, whom Magistros names Yuzik. Soviet historians (Hovhannisyan, Poghosyan, Arakelyan) took this as evidence of a link with the Khurramite movement of Babak in Atropatene (816–837) and with Mazdakite egalitarian ideas. Garsoïan and Nersessian doubt such a link for two reasons.

- The doctrine as reported by Gregory and Magistros rests on the New Testament and the epistles of Paul and contains no Zoroastrian or Islamic elements.
- Christian heresiologists commonly tied the founder of a sect to a foreign magus or astrologer, as with Simon Magus and Mani, in order to present the movement as un-Christian.

== Christological foundation ==
Medieval Armenian writers call the Tondrakians "Manichaeans" and ascribe to them a dualist belief in a good God, creator of the spiritual world, and an evil demiurge or Satan, creator of the material world and the human body. Conybeare, Garsoïan and Nersessian, after examining Gregory of Narek, Grigor Magistros and The Key of Truth, concluded that the Tondrakian teaching was adoptionist rather than dualist. Its main points were:

- The nature of Christ. The Tondrakians rejected the Trinitarian and Christological definitions of Nicaea and Chalcedon. In their view Jesus was born a man and was adopted by God the Father through the Holy Spirit at his baptism in the Jordan River, at the age of 30.
- The title "Christ". Gregory of Narek states that Smbat Zarehavantsi and his successors called themselves "Christ" and demanded veneration. Modern scholars read this in adoptionist terms: if Jesus became the Anointed One at his baptism, a community's chosen leader who received the same anointing could bear the same title.
- The Virgin Mary. The Tondrakians did not accept the title Theotokos (Θεοτόκος) or the doctrine of Mary's perpetual virginity, and regarded her as an ordinary woman who had other children by Joseph.

== Criticism of the church ==
Gregory of Narek's epistle to the monastery of Kchav lists the Tondrakian objections to the church, which are summarized below.

Tondrakian positions according to the sources
Institution or sacrament	Tondrakian position
Ordination and hierarchy	They held Orthodox ordination invalid because the clergy had abandoned apostolic simplicity and sold the gifts of the Spirit (simony). Their communities had their own "elect" presbyters.
Baptism and chrism	They rejected infant baptism because a newborn has no conscious faith or capacity for repentance. They called the font water "ordinary bath water" (jur baghaneats) and the chrism ordinary oil. Baptism was given in adulthood, at 30.
Eucharist	They rejected the transformation of bread and wine into the body and blood of Christ and called them ordinary food and drink. "Take, eat, this is my body" was read metaphorically as receiving Christ's word and commandments.
Cross and icons	They regarded the cross as an instrument of execution and its veneration as idolatry. They broke and burned stone and wooden crosses and held that the true cross is spiritual suffering in following Christ.
Church buildings and rites	They rejected stone churches as man-made, saying that "church" (ἐκκλησία) means an assembly of believers and that every pure person is a temple of God. They also rejected daily offices, genuflection and matagh (animal sacrifice).
Marriage	They did not recognize church marriage (the blessing of the crown) and held that marriage rests on the mutual love and consent of a man and a woman. Opponents presented this as debauchery and a rejection of the family.

=== Social consequences ===
Western historians reject the Soviet claim that the Tondrakians were atheists or purely political rebels, but scholars agree that their theology had social consequences. The Armenian Church was a major landowner, with monasteries holding hundreds of villages, and fees and tithes for baptism, marriage, funerals, requiem liturgies and matagh weighed heavily on the peasantry. By rejecting these rites and the idea that sins could be remitted after death through requiems, the Tondrakians challenged the church's income. Within their communities women could preach and lead, which medieval society and the official church did not accept.

== Spread of the movement ==
=== Leaders ===
After Smbat's death the movement was led by a series of leaders whose names Grigor Magistros preserves in order in his letters:

1. Todros (Theodoros)
2. Ananes (Anania)
3. Arkay
4. Sargis
5. Kyuregh (Cyril)
6. Yesayi (Isaiah)
7. Ghazar (Lazarus; active in the mid-11th century)

In the 10th century and the first half of the 11th, Tondrakian communities existed across much of Armenia.

=== Syunik and Hakob Syunetsi ===
In the early 10th century a large anti-church uprising took place in Syunik, which Stepanos Orbelian describes in his History of the Province of Sisakan. After the construction of Tatev Monastery (906), Bishop Hovhannes attached several nearby villages to it. The inhabitants of Tsuraberd, Tamalek, Aveghadasht and Berd refused to submit, attacked Tatev, broke its crosses and killed several monks.

Prince Smbat of Syunik put down the uprising and destroyed Tsuraberd. The movement also found a doctrinal voice in Metropolitan Hakob of Syunik (918–958), who called for simpler church rites and came into sharp conflict with Catholicos Anania I of Moks.

=== Vaspurakan, Mokk and Shirak ===
In the second half of the 10th century the movement spread in Vaspurakan (Rshtunik) and Mokk. A preacher named Mushegh won over the abbot and monks of Kchav Monastery, an important spiritual center in Mokk, and Gregory of Narek wrote his epistle of admonition in response.

In the same period Tondrakians appeared in Ani, the capital of the Bagratid kingdom, and in Shirak. In Shirak the Tondrakian preacher Nerses was executed. During the reign of Queen Katranide and King Gagik I, a clandestine group was found in Shirakavan, and on the order of the royal judge Yeghia its members were branded on the forehead with the mark of a fox and expelled from the country.

=== Hark and Mananaghi ===
In the first decades of the 11th century the movement was strongest in the cantons of Hark and Mananaghi. According to Aristakes Lastivertsi, it was organized in Hark by a monk named Kuntsik, whose preaching attracted the princes of the canton and Bishop Hakob of Hark. Hakob kept his office and introduced far-reaching reforms in his diocese:

- He banned matagh, teaching that the blood of animals cannot cleanse human sins.
- He told priests to celebrate the liturgy only three times a year instead of daily.
- He taught that liturgies and gifts offered after death were of no use to someone who had not repented in life.

Catholicos Sargis I of Armenia (992–1019) twice convened a church council to examine Hakob's case. When the bishop held his ground, the Catholicos had him defrocked, branded on the forehead with the mark of a fox and imprisoned. Hakob escaped to Constantinople and sought help from the Byzantine authorities, then returned to Hark, where he was killed.

In Mananaghi, through Kuntsik's preaching, the local lord Prince Vrver and the noblewomen Hranush, Akhni and Kamara joined the movement and founded communities in the villages of Kashe, Aghyuso and Tulayl. Vrver and his associates demolished the Church of St. Sargis in Kashe, broke the khachkars along the roads and expelled the Orthodox priests. Grigor Magistros wrote in his letters that Hranush and Kamara had become leaders of the Tondrakians, calling them "teachers of evil". Bishop Samvel of Mananaghi, with the help of local princes, attacked Bazmaghbyur and devastated Vrver's estate. Vrver later contracted leprosy, which Lastivertsi presented as divine punishment.

== Suppression by Grigor Magistros ==
After the fall of the Bagratid kingdom in 1045, the Byzantine Empire annexed the central and southwestern provinces of Armenia. Emperor Constantine IX Monomachos gave the Armenian prince and scholar Grigor Magistros Pahlavuni the title of magistros and made him governor of the southern provinces of Armenia and of Northern Mesopotamia.

In 1050–1054 Magistros used the regular Byzantine army to destroy the Tondrakian movement. Divisions among the Tondrakians helped him: former leaders Ghazar, Husik and Anania presented themselves to Magistros, renounced their faith, were baptized, and revealed the locations of the clandestine communities in Armenia and Mesopotamia and the names of their leaders.

His campaign had three main parts:

- Tondrak and Khnus. His forces captured and destroyed Tondrak, the movement's capital for about two centuries, which he called Shnavan ("town of dogs"). They burned the settlements, expelled the inhabitants and renamed Tondrak Marmaj.
- Tulayl and Kashe. The centers in Mananaghi and Hark were crushed, and the Tondrakians' religious manuscripts were confiscated and publicly burned.
- Forced baptism and exile. In his letters Magistros stresses that, although the law demanded death, he executed or mutilated no one. Thousands were instead baptized by force in the Armenian or Greek churches, while leaders and followers who refused were exiled to the western regions of the empire or expelled beyond its borders.

== Aftermath ==
=== The Bogomils and European movements ===
Many Tondrakians who escaped Magistros's persecution took refuge in Northern Syria and Mesopotamia (Amid, Nisibis, Edessa), where they preached among the Syriac Jacobite population and the local Arevordik. Magistros wrote his epistle to the Syriac Patriarch to counter this.

Another large group was deported by the Byzantine authorities to Thrace, where Armenian Paulicians had already been resettled in the 8th–10th centuries under Emperors Constantine V and John I Tzimiskes. In the Balkans the Paulicians and Tondrakians came into close contact with the Bulgarian Bogomils and the Phundagiagitae. Scholars hold that this contact contributed to the Bogomils' organization and ideas, and that through the Bogomils such ideas reached Northern Italy and Southern France (the Cathars and Albigensians) in the 12th–13th centuries.

=== Later Tondrakians and The Key of Truth ===
Although Magistros claimed to have wiped out the sect, small groups survived in Armenia for centuries. Poghos Taronatsi in the early 12th century and Nerses Shnorhali in the mid-12th century report that Tondrakians and remnants of the Paulicians still operated in secret in Mesopotamia, Taron and Upper Armenia.

After the Russo-Turkish War (1828–1829), a group of Armenian families from the village of Chevirme (Çevirme) in the Khnus district of Western Armenia settled in the village of Jradzor (Arkhvali) in the Shirak district of Eastern Armenia. In 1837 the Synod of Etchmiadzin found that these settlers belonged to a clandestine Tondrakian community led by Hovhannes Vahagnetsi. The judicial inquiry, whose records Aleksandr Yeritsyan published in 1880, showed that they rejected infant baptism, the cross, the intercession of saints and fasting.

During the investigation the community's sacred book, the manuscript of The Key of Truth (copied in Taron in 1782 by Hovhan Vahagnetsi), was confiscated. Its authenticity has long been debated. Some Armenian scholars (K. Ter-Mkrtchyan, V. Grigoryan) regarded it as a late 18th-century work or one written under Protestant influence. Conybeare, Garsoïan and Nersessian concluded that its archaic language, adoptionist Christology, baptism at 30 and rules for ordaining the "elect" make it a genuine heir to 9th–11th-century Tondrakian teaching.

The movement is the subject of Vahagn Davtyan's historical poem Tondraketsiner ("The Tondrakians", 1961).

== See also ==
- Paulicianism
- Messalians
- Kuntsik
- Vrver
