= Petrus Siculus =

Petrus Siculus, Peter Sikeliotes, or Peter of Sicily (Ancient Greek: Πέτρος Σικελιώτης) was the putative author of a text on the history of the Paulicians, originally titled the Useful History, Refutation, and Overthrow of the Hollow and Foolish Heresy of the Manichaeans, and known in Latin as the Historia Manichaeorum. He is only attested from the sole surviving manuscript of this text, and owing to textual contradictions and doubts over the authenticity of its provenance, there is no scholarly consensus on Peter's identity, or even his historical existence.

According the narrative contained within the History, Peter was sent as a legate from the Byzantine emperor Basil I to the Paulician leader Chrysocheir in 869–70, negotiating for an exchange of prisoners. He stayed in the Paulician city of Tephrike/Tibrica, now Divriği in Turkey, on the upper Euphrates, for nine months, and wrote the text during this time. However, references to the author in the set of sermons against the Paulicians appended to the History appear to describe him as a monk and contain no reference to any imperial commission, and the History displays a knowledge of theology and heresiology that seem to better fit an ecclesiastic than an ambassador.

If the History is taken at face value, it was composed in 870–72, postdating the mission but before the death of Chrysocheir, who is treated as still alive. The History was first published by Matthaeus Rader in Ingolstadt in 1604. Historians of the Paulicians have since debated the authenticity of the text inconclusively, with some scholars such as Nina Garsoïan arguing that it is a later, 10th-century forgery, and others such as Paul Lemerle defending its 9th-century background. Adding to the complexity of this debate, the text in its surviving form contains multiple narrative layers, the core content revolving around the mission to Tephrike to the east being couched within an appeal to suppress the spread of the heresy in Bulgaria. The text in its existing form is subtitled "disguised as if written to the Archbishop of Bulgaria" (προσωποποιηθεῖσα ὡσ πρὸς τὸν ἀρχιεπίσκοπον Βουλγαρίας), perhaps a recognition by a later hand of the difficulty of reconciling these components.
