= Umar al-Aqta =

Arab Emir of Malatya from the 830s to 863

- Emir of Malatya
- Reign: 830s–863
- Died: 3 September 863; Porson
- Religion: Islam

ʿUmar ibn ʿAbdallāh ibn Marwān or ʿAmr ibn ʿUbaydallāh ibn Marwān, surnamed al-Aqtaʾ (Arabic: الأقطع, lit. 'the one-handed'; μονοχεράρης, monocherares, in Greek), and found as Amer or Ambros (Ἄμερ or Ἄμβρος) in Byzantine sources, was the semi-independent Arab emir of Malatya (Melitene) from the 830s until his death in the Battle of Lalakaon on 3 September 863. During this time, he was one of the greatest threats to the Byzantine Empire on its eastern frontier, and became a prominent figure in later Arabic and Turkish epic literature.

== Biography ==
ʿUmar belonged to the Banu Sulaym tribe, which was established in the western Jazira at the time of the Muslim conquests and played an important role in the affairs of Malatya and al-Awasim, the frontier zone with the Byzantine Empire, as well as the South Caucasus frontier with the Khazars. His father, ʿAbdallah or ʿUbaydallah, is little known, except that he was also emir of Malatya, and that ca. 810 he surrendered to the Byzantines the fortress of Kamacha to obtain the release of his son, who was held captive.

ʿUmar himself probably became emir of Malatya in the 830s, and first appears in 838, in the Sack of Amorium of Caliph al-Mu'tasim (r. 833–842). The campaign was waged in retaliation for a large-scale raid in the previous year by the Byzantine emperor Theophilos (r. 829–842) against the Arab border emirates, including Malatya, whose territory was laid waste and depopulated. During the Amorium campaign, ʿUmar took part with his men in the great Arab victory over Theophilos himself at the Battle of Anzen in July 838. In the 840s, he provided refuge to the surviving members of the Paulicians, who were fleeing persecution in Byzantium, and allocated them the area around the fortresses of Tephrike, Amara and Argaoun. The Paulician leader Karbeas turned this into the Paulician principality of Tephrike, allied with ‘Umar and launching frequent expeditions against Byzantium, either in conjunction with ʿUmar or independently. In 844, ʿUmar's forces participated in a major raid that inflicted a heavy defeat upon an army led by the Byzantine chief minister, Theoktistos, at the Battle of Mauropotamos. In the late 840s, he was also engaged in warfare against a neighbouring Armenian lord named Skleros, whom he finally vanquished after a protracted and bloody conflict.

Map of Byzantine Asia Minor and the Arab–Byzantine borderlands in ʿUmar's time

In the 850s, ʿUmar is recorded as having defeated an expedition led by the Byzantine emperor Michael III (r. 842–867) against Samosata, and to have carried out a number of successful raids into Byzantium. One of them swept through the themes of Thrakesion and Opsikion and reached up to the great Byzantine army base of Malagina in Bithynia. He was unable, however, to stop a retaliatory expedition launched in 856 by Petronas against Melitene and Tephrike, which raided all the way to Amida, taking many prisoners before returning home.

In 860, along with Karbeas, ʿUmar launched a major raid into Anatolia which reached the Black Sea port of Sinope, returning with over 12,000 head of captured livestock. Three years later, he was part of a major Abbasid force that invaded Anatolia through the Cilician Gates. After splitting off from the main force and repulsing a Byzantine army under Emperor Michael III at Mardj al-Usquf ("Bishop's Meadow") in Cappadocia, ʿUmar with his men headed north to sack the port city of Amisos. On his return, however, he was encircled by the Byzantines and killed at the Battle of Lalakaon on 3 September 863. Only a splinter of his army escaped under his son, but was then defeated and captured by the commander of the Charsianon district. According to al-Tabari, when the news of ʿUmar's death, along with that of another celebrated leader, Ali ibn Yahya al-Armani, arrived in Iraq, they provoked riots among the populace of Baghdad, Samarra, and other cities, angry at the Abbasid government's perceived incompetence.

Indeed, ʿUmar's death marked the end of Malatya as a military threat to Byzantium, although the city itself would remain in Muslim hands for 70 more years. ʿUmar himself was succeeded by his son, Abu Abdallah, and grandson, Abu Hafs ibn Amr, who was forced to surrender the city to the Byzantine general John Kourkouas in 934.

== Cultural legacy ==
Like many other protagonists of the Arab–Byzantine Wars, ʿUmar figures in both Arab and Byzantine legend. In the Arab epic romance "Tale of Delhemma and al-Battal" (Sīrat Ḏāt al-Himma wa-l-Baṭṭāl), he is a major figure, although his role has been diminished and he is often cast as almost a villain, due to the tale's bias in favour of the Banu Sulaym's rivals, the Banu Kilab, who furnish most of the heroic characters. Traditions about ʿUmar seem also to have influenced the story cycle around ‘Umar ibn al-Numan and his sons which became included in the One Thousand and One Nights, while ʿUmar himself features in later Turkish epic literature centred around the heroic figure of Battal Ghazi (inspired by the real-life Umayyad general Abdallah al-Battal), who is also one of the main heroes of the Delhemma.

In Byzantine literature, ʿUmar is regarded by modern scholars as the probable prototype for the emir Ambron, the grandfather of the eponymous hero in the epic poem Digenes Akritas, while the Greek scholar G. Veloudis suggested him as the origin of the eponymous hero of the Song of Armouris. The German scholar Hans-Georg Beck finds this identification unlikely, but points out the reference to a "short-armed" Arab leader in the same tale, which may reflect a folk tradition based on ʿUmar. Finally, the 10th-century scholar al-Mas'udi reports (The Meadows of Gold, VIII, 74–75) that ʿUmar was among the "illustrious Muslims" whose portraits were displayed in Byzantine churches in recognition of their valour.

== Sources ==
- Beck, Hans Georg (1971). Geschichte der byzantinischen Volksliteratur (in German). Munich: C.H. Beck. ISBN 978-3-406-01420-8.
- Canard, Marius (1961). "Les principaux personnages du roman de chevalerie arabe Ḏāt al-Himma wa-l-Baṭṭāl". Arabica (in French). 8 (2): 158–173. doi:10.1163/157005861X00377. ISSN 0570-5398. JSTOR 4055170.
- Dedes, Georgios (1996). The Battalname, an Ottoman Turkish Frontier Epic Wondertale: Introduction, Turkish Transcription, English Translation and Commentary (PDF). Sources of Oriental Languages and Literatures. Cambridge, Massachusetts: Harvard University, Department of Near Eastern languages and Literatures.
- Hollingsworth, Paul A. (1991). "'Umar". In Kazhdan, Alexander (ed.). The Oxford Dictionary of Byzantium. Oxford and New York: Oxford University Press. pp. 2139–2140. ISBN 0-19-504652-8.
- Honigmann, E. [in French] (1987). "Malaṭya". In Houtsma, Martijn Theodoor (ed.). E.J. Brill's First Encyclopaedia of Islam, 1913–1936, Volume V: L–Moriscos. Leiden: BRILL. pp. 192–197. ISBN 978-90-04-08265-6.
- Lilie, Ralph-Johannes; Ludwig, Claudia; Pratsch, Thomas; Zielke, Beate (2013). Prosopographie der mittelbyzantinischen Zeit Online. Berlin-Brandenburgische Akademie der Wissenschaften. Nach Vorarbeiten F. Winkelmanns erstellt (in German). Berlin and Boston: De Gruyter.
- Saliba, George, ed. (1985). The History of al-Ṭabarī, Volume XXXV: The Crisis of the ʿAbbāsid Caliphate: The Caliphates of al-Mustaʿīn and al-Muʿtazz, A.D. 862–869/A.H. 248–255. SUNY Series in Near Eastern Studies. Albany, New York: State University of New York Press. ISBN 978-0-87395-883-7.
- Treadgold, Warren (1997). A History of the Byzantine State and Society. Stanford, California: Stanford University Press. ISBN 0-8047-2630-2.
- Whittow, Mark (1996). The Making of Byzantium, 600–1025. Berkeley and Los Angeles, California: University of California Press. ISBN 978-0-520-20496-6.

Unknown	Emir of Malatya; 830s–863	Succeeded by Abu Abdallah ibn Umar al-Aqta
