= Bathys Rhyax =

Town of ancient Pontus

Coordinates: 39°50′12″N 36°42′04″E

Bathys Rhyax (Greek: Βαθύς Ρύαξ), possibly also called Krya Pege, was a town of ancient Pontus on the road from Berissa to Sebasteia, inhabited during Byzantine times.

Its site is located 8 miles (13 km) southeast of Yıldızeli in Asiatic Turkey.
