= Karbeas =

Karbeas (Ancient Greek: Καρβέας), also Karbaias (Καρβαίας), was a Paulician leader, who, following the anti-Paulician pogroms in 843, abandoned his service in the Byzantine army and went over to the Arabs. With the aid of the emir of Melitene, Umar al-Aqta, he founded the Paulician principality of Tephrike, which he ruled until his death in 863. During this period he participated alongside Umar in several raids against the Byzantine Empire.

== Life ==
Karbeas belonged to a Paulician family, and entered into the Byzantine army, rising to the post of protomandator (senior staff officer) under Theodotos Melissenos, the strategos (military governor) of the Anatolic Theme.

Map of Byzantine Anatolia and the Arab–Byzantine borderlands in the mid-9th century

During the first decades of the 9th century, the Paulicians were well established as a numerous and warlike community across Asia Minor, but were seen as heretics by the Byzantine state and consequently suffered on-and-off persecution. Under the leadership of their spiritual and military head, Sergius-Tychicus, they staged a number of revolts against Byzantium from their various strongholds throughout Asia Minor, occasionally collaborating with the Arabs. As a result, the Byzantine empress-regent Theodora launched an empire-wide pogrom against the Paulicians in 843, where allegedly up to 100,000 Paulicians perished. Among the victims was Karbeas' father, who was impaled after refusing to renounce his faith. Consequently, with some 5,000 followers, Karbeas fled to the Arab emirate of Melitene. It is however possible that Karbeas and his co-religionists had fled to Arab territory before the pogrom, during the reign of Theodora's husband Theophilos (r. 829–842).

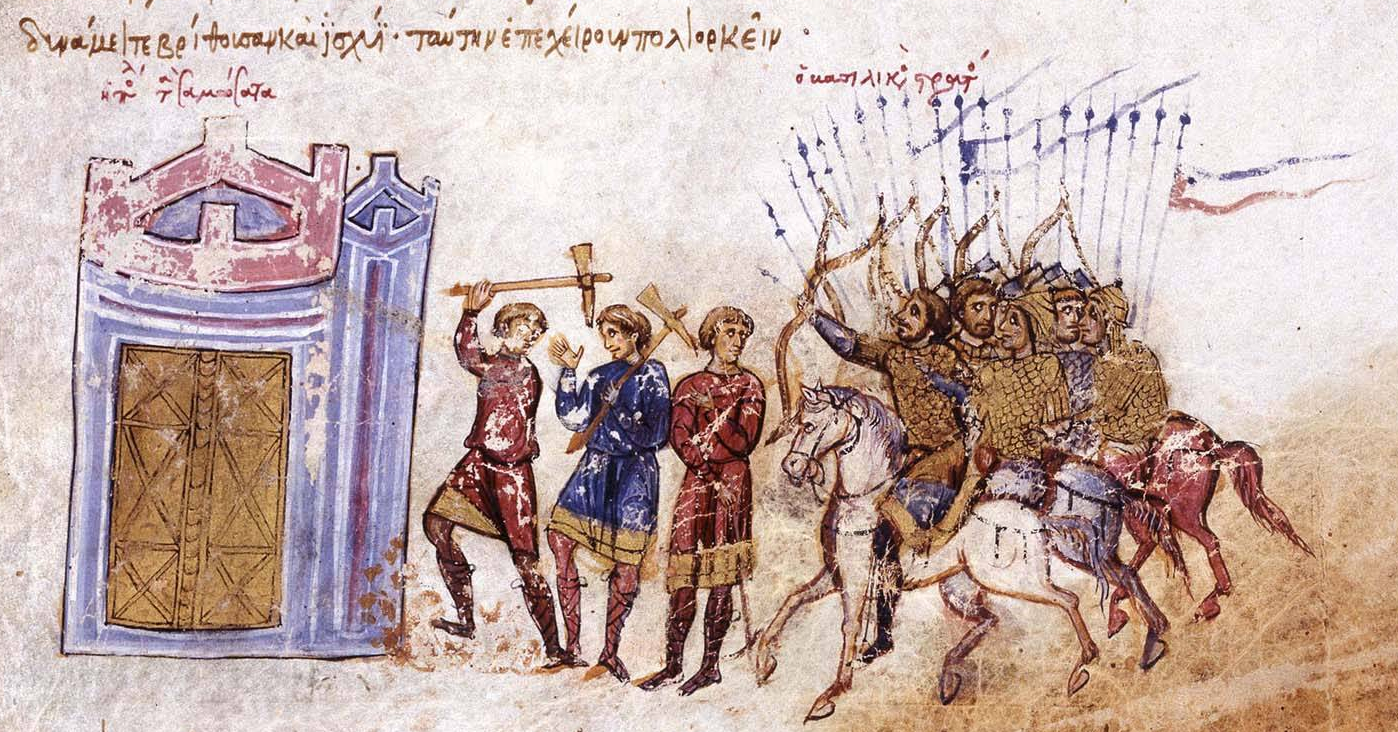
Depiction of the Byzantine attack on Samosata in 859, from the Madrid Skylitzes

With the aid of the emir of Melitene, Umar al-Aqta, Karbeas established an independent Paulician state centred on Tephrike on the Upper Euphrates, which also included the newly founded cities of Amara and Argaous. From there, he participated regularly in the raids by the Arab border emirates into Byzantine Asia Minor. According to the Patriarch Photius, Karbeas was only the military leader of the Paulician community, and no successor to Sergius as the spiritual head was appointed. Indeed, Photius records that although capable and gifted with persuasive speech, Karbeas was utterly without moral scruples, and that he fought less for his faith, rather than for glory. According to a version of the martyrdom of the 42 Martyrs of Amorium, in 845 he was at the Abbasid Caliphate's capital of Samarra, with several of his men. In 859, along with Umar he scored a major success in repelling a Byzantine attack on Samosata, led by Emperor Michael III (r. 842–867) and his uncle Bardas in person, taking many captives, some of whom he managed to persuade to join him. He died in 863, either of natural causes or at the hands of the Byzantines in the Battle of Lalakaon, and was succeeded by his nephew, Chrysocheir.

== Cultural impact ==
Karbeas has been suggested as the inspiration behind Karoes (Καρώης), the Muslim uncle of the father of Digenes Akritas, the eponymous hero of the most famous of the Acritic songs. In a similar manner, Chrysocheir is found in the figure of Digenes's grandfather, Chrysocheres. The 10th-century account of al-Mas'udi (The Meadows of Gold, VIII, 74–75) considers him a Muslim, listing him among the illustrious Muslims whose portraits were displayed in Byzantine churches in recognition of their valour. In addition, Marius Canard proposed him as an archetype for Yanis in the popular early Abbasid Arab epic Delhemma.

== Sources ==
- Beaton, Roderick; Ricks, David (1993). Digenēs Akritēs: New Approaches to Byzantine Heroic Poetry. Aldershot: Variorum. ISBN 978-0-86078-395-4.
- Canard, Marius (1965). "D̲h̲u 'l-Himma". In Lewis, B.; Pellat, Ch. & Schacht, J. (eds.). The Encyclopaedia of Islam, Second Edition. Volume II: C–G. Leiden: E. J. Brill. pp. 233–239. OCLC 495469475.
- Kazhdan, Alexander, ed. (1991). The Oxford Dictionary of Byzantium. Oxford and New York: Oxford University Press. ISBN 0-19-504652-8.
- Lilie, Ralph-Johannes; Ludwig, Claudia; Pratsch, Thomas; Zielke, Beate (2000). "Karbeas (#3625)". Prosopographie der mittelbyzantinischen Zeit: 1. Abteilung (641–867), Band 2: Georgios (# 2183) – Leon (# 4270) (in German). Berlin and Boston: De Gruyter. pp. 455–456. ISBN 978-3-11-016672-9.
- Nersessian, Vrej (1987). The Tondrakian Movement: Religious Movements in the Armenian Church from the Fourth to the Tenth Centuries. London: Kahn & Averill. ISBN 978-0-900707-92-6.
- Vasiliev, Alexander A. (1935). Byzance et les Arabes, Tome I: La dynastie d'Amorium (820–867). Corpus Bruxellense Historiae Byzantinae (in French). Vol. 1. French ed.: Henri Grégoire, Marius Canard. Brussels: Éditions de l'Institut de philologie et d'histoire orientales.
- Whittow, Mark (1996). The Making of Byzantium, 600–1025. Berkeley and Los Angeles, California: University of California Press. ISBN 978-0-520-20496-6.
