= Constantine-Silvanus =

Constantine-Silvanus (died 684) was the founder of the Paulicians, a Christian movement in 7th century Armenia, who sought to return to the purity of the church in the time of Paul the Apostle. They were considered heretical by the Byzantine Church.

Constantine was born in Mananali, near Samosata, Commagene. About 653 A.D., Constantine became friends with Soghmon, a traveling Armenian who had been held captive by the Saracens. Soghmon gave Constantine a copy of the four gospels and the letters of Paul. Reading the gospels and epistles caused Constantine to change his name to Silvanus, after the companion of Paul, and begin preaching, gathering around him a group of followers who rejected what they considered the image worship and superstition of the Byzantine Church. Silvanus founded his first congregation, who became known as Paulicians, in Kibossa, near Colonia, in Armenia. For thirty years he traveled extensively, along the Euphrates valley, across the Taurus Mountains, and into the western parts of Asia Minor, making converts on the way. His missionary activities came to the attention of the Byzantine Emperor, Constans II, known as Constantine Pogonatus (the bearded).

The Emperor issued a decree condemning the teachings of Silvanus and sentenced him to death by stoning. Simeon, the officer sent to carry out the execution, ordered Silvanus' friends and followers to stone him. The followers refused and dropped their stones, except for one young man, Justus, whom Silvanus had raised like an adopted son, who cast a stone at Silvanus and killed him. Simeon was impressed with the piety of Silvanus' followers and joined them, taking the name Titus. Justus betrayed Titus and the Paulicians by informing on them to the bishop. Emperor Justinian II ordered Titus and all the Paulicians to be burned to death as heretics in 690.

== Sources ==
- Encyclopædia Britannica retrieved 17:09, 20 September 2005
