= Chrysocheir =

Leader of the Paulician state

Chrysocheir (Greek: Χρυσόχειρ), also known as Chrysocheres, Chrysocheris, or Chrysocheiros (Χρυσόχερης/Χρυσόχερις/Χρυσόχειρος), all meaning "goldhand", was the second and last leader of the Paulician principality of Tephrike from 863 to his death in either 872 or 878.

== Biography ==
Byzantine Asia Minor and the Byzantine-Arab frontier region in the middle of the 9th century

According to the Byzantine chroniclers, Chrysocheir was a nephew of the Paulician leader Karbeas. Furthermore, according to Peter the Sicilian, he was Karbeas' "nephew and son-in-law", indicating that he had married his first cousin, a practice strongly condemned by the Byzantine Church. Following the anti-Paulician campaign launched in 843 by the Empress-regent Theodora, Karbeas and many of his followers had fled to the Muslim border emirates and established an independent principality centred on Tephrike. From there, Karbeas led the Paulicians in wars against the Byzantine Empire on the side of the Muslims until his death in 863.

Nothing is known of Chrysocheir's early life before his succession of his uncle. Like Karbeas, Chrysocheir may in his youth have served in the Byzantine army. A steadfast enemy of Byzantium, Chrysocheir led several raids deep into Byzantine territory even up to the western coasts of Asia Minor and the vicinity of Nicaea, Nicomedia, and Ephesus. In the latter, he is reported to have desecrated the Church of Saint John the Evangelist by stabling his horses there. Emperor Basil I the Macedonian sent envoys to offer peace in 869/70, but the offer was rejected by Chrysocheir, who allegedly demanded that the emperor should vacate the eastern half of his territories in Asia Minor first. It is possible that the embassy was led by Peter the Sicilian, who reports that he spent nine months in Tephrike at about the same time trying to arrange the release of high-ranking prisoners of war. This hypothesis is not accepted by all modern scholars, however.

In 871, Emperor Basil himself led an attack on Tephrike, but failed to take the city and withdrew. In 872/3, the Domestic of the Schools Christopher led another campaign that scored a decisive victory against the Paulicians at the Battle of Bathys Ryax. During the battle, Chrysocheir was killed by a common soldier called Poullades. His severed head was sent back to Constantinople, where Basil reportedly shot at it with his bow, sticking three arrows into it. It was not until six years later, however, that Tephrike itself fell to the Byzantines, putting an end to the Paulician principality. Some modern scholars nevertheless date the defeat and death of Chrysocheir on the same year as the fall of Tephrike (i.e. 878/9).

It is commonly considered that the memory of Chrysocheir survived in the Byzantine epic poem Digenes Akritas in the form of "Chrysoberges" (Χρυσοβέργης), the Muslim paternal grandfather of the eponymous hero.

== Sources ==
- Kazhdan, Alexander, ed. (1991). The Oxford Dictionary of Byzantium. Oxford and New York: Oxford University Press. ISBN 0-19-504652-8.
- Lilie, Ralph-Johannes; Ludwig, Claudia; Pratsch, Thomas; Zielke, Beate (2013). Prosopographie der mittelbyzantinischen Zeit Online. Berlin-Brandenburgische Akademie der Wissenschaften. Nach Vorarbeiten F. Winkelmanns erstellt (in German). Berlin and Boston: De Gruyter.
- Whittow, Mark (1996). The Making of Byzantium, 600–1025. Berkeley and Los Angeles, California: University of California Press. ISBN 978-0-520-20496-6.
