= Paulicianism =

Christian sect formed in 7th century Armenia

Paulicianism (Classical Armenian: Պաւղիկեաններ, Pawłikeanner; Medieval Greek: Παυλικιανοί, "The followers of Paul"; Arab sources: Baylakānī, al Bayāliqa البيالقة) was a Christian sect which originated in Armenia in the 7th century. Followers of the sect were called Paulicians and referred to themselves as Good Christians. Little is known about the Paulician faith and various influences have been suggested, including Gnosticism, Marcionism, Manichaeism and Adoptionism, with other scholars arguing that doctrinally the Paulicians were a largely conventional Christian reform movement unrelated to any of these currents.

The founder of the Paulicians is traditionally held to have been an Armenian by the name of Constantine, who hailed from a Syrian community near Samosata in modern-day Turkey. The sect flourished between 650 and 872 around the Byzantine Empire's frontier with the Arab Caliphate in Armenia and Eastern Anatolia, despite intermittent persecutions and deportations by the imperial authorities in Constantinople. After a period of relative toleration, renewed Byzantine persecution in the mid 9th century prompted the Paulicians to establish a state centered on Tephrike in the Armenian borderlands under Arab protection.

After prolonged warfare, the state of Tephrike was destroyed by the Byzantines in the 870s. Over the next century, some Paulicians migrated further into Armenia, while others were relocated by the imperial authorities to the Empire's Balkan frontier in Thrace. In Armenia, the Paulicians were assimilated into the related religious movement of Tondrakism over the next century. In Thrace, the sect continued practicing their faith for some time, in some places until the 17th–18th centuries, before gradually converting to other religions and are considered to be the ancestors of the modern Roman Catholic Banat Bulgarians and the Muslim Pomaks. The movement may have also been an influence on medieval European Christian heterodox movements such as Bogomilism and Catharism.

== Etymology ==
The Paulicians called themselves "Good Christians" or "True Believers", and referred to orthodox Christians as "Romanists". The name 'Paulician' was used by outsiders to refer to the sect and literally means 'the followers of Paul'. The identity of the Paul for whom the movement was named is disputed. It is most likely to be Paul the Apostle, a figure whom the Paulicians are consistently stated as according special veneration from the earliest sources up to their apparent extinction in the early modern period. Certain medieval Byzantine and Muslim sources associate the sect with the 3rd century Bishop of Antioch, Paul of Samosata. This may be a conflation with the separate Paulianist sect, however, and the earliest Byzantine source to describe the movement explicitly distinguishes the "Paul of Samosata" supposed to have given the movement its name from the more famous heresiarch. Another possible source is Paul the Armenian, an otherwise obscure Paulician figure said to have led the sect in its migration to Episparis following its persecution by Justinian II at the close of the 7th century.

== History ==
=== Origins and growth ===
The sources indicate that most Paulician leaders were Armenians and the founder of the sect is said to have been an Armenian by the name of Constantine, who hailed from Mananalis, a community near Samosata. He studied the Gospels and Epistles, combined dualistic and Christian doctrines and vigorously opposed the formalism of the church. Regarding himself as having been called to restore the pure Christianity of Paul the Apostle, he adopted the name of Silvanus (one of Paul's disciples), and about 660, he founded his first congregation at Kibossa, Armenia. Twenty-seven years later, he was arrested by the Imperial authorities, tried for heresy and stoned to death. Simeon, the court official who executed the order, was himself converted, and adopting the name Titus, became Constantine's successor. He was burned to death, the punishment pronounced upon the Manichaeans, in 690.

The adherents of the sect fled, with their new leader Paul at their head, to Episparis. He died in 715, leaving two sons, Gegnaesius (whom he had appointed his successor) and Theodore. The latter, giving out that he had received the Holy Ghost, protested against the leadership of Gegnaesius but was unsuccessful. Gegnaesius was taken to Constantinople, appeared before Emperor Leo III, was declared innocent of heresy and returned to Episparis, but, fearing danger, went with his adherents to Mananalis in Eastern Anatolia. His death (in 745) was the occasion of a division in the sect.

In 747, Emperor Constantine V is reported to have moved a significant number of Paulicians from Eastern Anatolia to Thrace to strengthen the Bulgarian frontier, beginning the presence of the sect in Europe. Despite deportations and continued persecution the sect continued to grow, receiving additions from some of the iconoclasts.

Patriarch John of Otzun wrote extensively against Paulicianism in his Dogmatic and Theological Treatises , and this was one of the topics discussed at the Fifth Council of Dvin (720) and again at the Council of Manzikert in 726.

In the late eighth century, the Paulicians suffered a schism and split into two groupings; the Baanites (the old party) and the Sergites (the reformed sect). Sergius, the reformed leader, was a zealous and effective converter for his sect; he boasted that he had spread his Gospel "from East to West; from North to South". Sergius succeeded in supplanting Baanes, the leader of the old party, by 801 and was active for the next thirty-four years. His activity was the occasion of renewed persecutions on the part of Leo the Armenian. Upon the death of Sergius, the control of the sect was divided between several leaders.

=== Formation of Paulician state ===
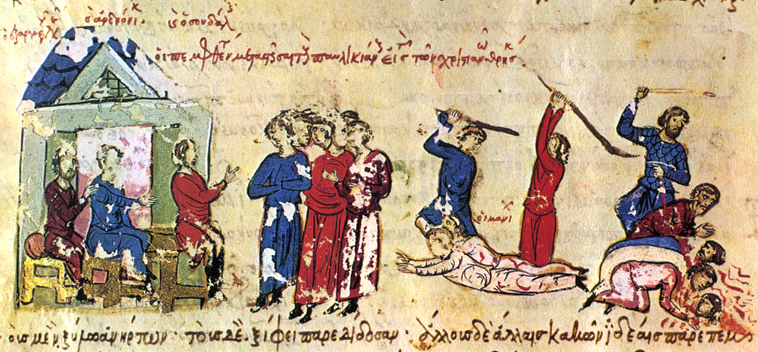
The massacre of the Paulicians in 843/844, from the Madrid Skylitzes

In 843, the Empress Theodora, as regent to her son Michael III, instituted a major persecution against the Paulicians throughout Asia Minor in which 100,000 adherents in Byzantine Armenia alone were said to have lost their lives or property.

In response to the renewed persecution many Paulicians, under their new leader Karbeas, fled across the border to the areas of Armenia under Arab control. Under the protection of Umar al-Aqta, the Emir of Melitene, the sect was permitted by the Arabs to build two fortress cities, Amara and Tephrike, and establish an independent state. Karbeas died in 863 during Michael III's campaign against the Arabs and possibly was with Umar at Malakopea before the Battle of Lalakaon.

Karbeas's successor, Chrysocheres ('the goldenhand'), devastated many cities in the continued wars with the Byzantines; in 867, he advanced as far as Ephesus, where he took many priests as prisoners. In 868, Emperor Basil I dispatched Petrus Siculus to arrange for their exchange. His sojourn of nine months among the Paulicians gave him an opportunity to collect many facts, which he preserved in his History of the empty and vain heresy of the Manichæans, otherwise called Paulicians. The propositions of peace were not accepted, the war was renewed, and Chrysocheres was killed at Battle of Bathys Ryax in 872 or 878.

=== Destruction of Paulician state and displacement ===
By 878, the emperor Basil I had conquered the Paulician strongholds in Asia Minor (including Tephrike) and the survivors from the destruction of the Paulician state were largely displaced. One group migrated east further into Armenia, where they were assimilated into the emerging Tondrakian sect throughout the 10th century. Others were transferred to the Western frontier of the empire, including a military detachment of some 20,000 Paulicians serving in Byzantine Italy under the general Nikephoros Phokas the Elder.

In 970, 200,000 Paulicians on Byzantine territory were reportedly transferred by the emperor John Tzimisces to Philippopolis in Thrace. As a reward for their promise to keep back "the Scythians" (in fact Bulgars), the emperor granted the group toleration to practice their faith unmolested. This marked the start of a revival for the sect in the West.

=== Revival in Thrace ===
The policy of transferring Paulicians to the West proved to be harmful for the Byzantines, with the group bringing limited economic and military benefits for the empire's Balkan frontier. The sect also failed to assimilate with the orthodox Roman and Bulgarian inhabitants and are reported to have successfully converted many existing inhabitants of Thrace to their heresy. According to Anna Komnene, by the end of the 11th century, Philippopolis and its surroundings were entirely inhabited by Paulicians and were being joined by new groups of Armenian migrants.

According to Annales Barenses, several thousand Paulicians served in the army of Emperor Alexios I Komnenos against the Norman Robert Guiscard in 1081 but subsequently deserted the emperor and were imprisoned. The Alexiad, written by the emperor's daughter Anna, reports that Alexios I succeeded in converting many of the sects around Philippopolis to Christian orthodoxy, building a new city of Alexiopolis for the converts.

During the First Crusade some Paulicians, called "Publicani", were present in the Muslim armies although others were reported as assisting the Crusaders. When Frederick Barbarossa passed near Philippopolis during the Third Crusade, on the contrary to the Greek inhabitants, they welcomed him as a liberator. In 1205, the Paulicians cooperated with Kaloyan to surrender Philippopolis to the Second Bulgarian Empire.

=== Later history ===
According to the historian Yordan Ivanov, some of the remaining Thracian Paulicians converted to Eastern Orthodox Christianity during the Second Bulgarian Empire. After the fall of the Bulgarian Empire and the conquest of Thrace by the Ottoman Empire, this group then converted with some Bulgarians to Islam, forming the heterogenous community of Bulgarian-speaking Muslims, commonly known as Pomak.

The remaining Thracian Paulicians who still practiced their original faith are said to have eventually converted to Roman Catholicism during the 16th or 17th century. At the end of the 17th century, these Roman Catholic descendants of Paulicians were living around Nikopol, Bulgaria, and suffered religious persecution by the Ottomans. After the uprising of Chiprovtsi in 1688, a large number of this group fled across the Danube, settled in the Banat region and became known as Banat Bulgarians. After Bulgaria's liberation from Ottoman rule in 1878, a number of these Banat Bulgarians resettled in the northern part of Bulgaria.

In Armenia, after the Russo-Turkish War of 1828–1829, communities whose practices were believed to be influenced by the Paulicians or Tondrakians could still be found in the part of Armenia controlled by Russia. Documents of their professions of faith and disputations with the Gregorian bishop about 1837 were later published by Frederick Cornwallis Conybeare.

== Beliefs ==
The Paulicians self-identified as Christians, but much about the nature of their beliefs is disputed. Their beliefs prompted Christian critics to brand them as Jews, Muslims, and Manichaeans but it is likely that their opponents employed these as pejorative appellations meant as terms of abuse, rather than as an accurate reflection of their beliefs. Examples of the disputed doctrines of the Paulicians include debate as to how they perceived the nature of God, the nature of Christ, and debate surrounding their worship rituals.

=== Sources ===
There are few sources for the beliefs of the Paulicians except for the reports of opponents and some Paulician material preserved in the History of the Paulician Heresy by Petrus Siculus, comprising certain letters ascribed to Sergius-Tychicus and, seemingly, a reworking of an account of their history composed by the Paulicians themselves. For some scholars, another major source is The Key of Truth, a text claimed to be a manual of the medieval Paulician or Tondrakian church in Armenia. This text was first identified by Armenian ecclesiastical authorities in 1837 while tracing a group of dissidents led by Hovhannes Vartabedian; British Orientalist Frederick Conybeare published a translation and edition of it in 1898. The manuscript transmission of the Key is traced to the late 18th century, leading historians to raise doubts over its background, with some suggesting that its composition was influenced by Protestant missionary activity in Armenia at that time.

=== Dualism ===
Some scholars argue that the Paulician belief system was dualistic, a cosmological system of twin, opposing deities; an Evil demiurge who is author and lord of the present visible world; and a Good Spirit who is the God of the future world. Dualist cosmologies were professed by the Near Eastern Manichaean faith, as well as early Christian sects such as the Marcionists, and the sect's identification with dualism led the Paulicians to be traditionally labeled as Manichaeans and Marcionists by critics and scholars.

Eighteenth century scholar Johann Lorenz von Mosheim criticised the identification of Paulicians as Manichaeans, and although he agreed both sects were dualistic, he argued that the Paulicians differed on several points and undoubtedly rejected the doctrine of the prophet Mani. Johann Karl Ludwig Gieseler and August Neander saw the sect as deriving from Marcionism, considering them as descendants of a dualistic sect reformed to become closer to proto-orthodox Early Christianity yet unable to be freed from Gnosticism. By the mid-19th century the mainstream scholarly theory was that the sect was a non-Manichaean, dualistic Gnostic doctrine with substantial elements of Early Christianity closest to Marcionism, although others disputed this. Frederick Conybeare asserted that "The Paulicians are not dualists in any other sense than the New Testament is itself dualistic. Satan is simply the adversary of man and God".

The reports of Catholic missionaries working among the remaining Paulicians in the Balkans during the 16th–18th centuries do not reference dualist beliefs.

=== Christology ===
Paulicians may have held several unorthodox beliefs about Jesus, including nontrinitarianism (the belief that Jesus was not coeternal, coequal and indivisibly united in one being with God the Father and the Holy Spirit) and docetism (the belief that Jesus only seemed to be human, and that his human form was an illusion). Nontrinitarian beliefs were held by Arian Christians and many early Christian sects such as the Adoptionists. The identification with nontrinitarianism sometimes led the Paulicians to be labeled as Arians by critics and Adoptionists by scholars.

Frederick Conybeare, in his edition of The Key of Truth, concluded that "The word Trinity is nowhere used, and was almost certainly rejected as being unscriptural" and that Paulicians believed that Christ came down from heaven to emancipate humans from the body and from the world. Conybeare also asserted that the movement were survivors of early Adoptionist Christianity in Armenia rather than dualist or Gnostic sects. Conybeare's theory, part of a broader argument that Adoptionism represented the original form of Christianity that had subsequently been suppressed by the Catholic Church, met a skeptical reception at the time. In the 1960s, however, Nina Garsoïan, in a comprehensive study of both Greek and Armenian sources, argued in support of a link to Adoptionism, and asserted that Paulicianism independently developed features of docetism and dualism.

In a paper presented to the Unitarian Christian Alliance Conference in 2022, Atlanta Bible College adjunct professor Sean Finnegan argued that the Armenian sect which produced The Key of Truth, while nontrinitarian, did not hold an Adoptionist Christology. Evidence against an Adoptionist Christology includes an affirmation of the virgin birth in chapter 23 of The Key of Truth, as well as the use of the phrase "only-born" in The Key of Truth chapters 2, 17, 21, and 22.

=== Rituals, practices and views of scripture ===
The Paulicians were said to have used a different canon of sacred texts from the orthodox Christian bible. Byzantine scholars claimed that the sect accepted the four Gospels (especially of Luke); fourteen Epistles of Paul; the three Epistles of John; the epistles of James and Jude; and an Epistle to the Laodiceans, which they professed to have. On the Byzantine account, the Paulicians rejected the First Epistle of Peter and the whole Tanakh, also known as the Hebrew Bible or Old Testament.

In common with the Nestorians, the Paulicians were said to have rejected the title Theotokos ("Mother of God") for Mary and refused all veneration of her. The sect's places of worship were apparently called "places of prayer" and were small rooms in modest houses and, despite their potential ascetic tendencies, made no distinction in foods and practiced marriage. Due to supposed iconoclasm it was asserted that the sect rejected the Christian cross, rites, sacraments, the worship, and the hierarchy of the established Church, because of which Edward Gibbon considered them as "worthy precursors of Reformation". Some historians have also viewed them as proto-protestants.

In the putatively Paulician or Tondrakian work The Key of Truth, copied in the 18th century, the Old Testament, Baptism, Penance, and the Eucharist are all accepted. Early modern Catholic reports of the Paulicians remaining in the Balkans claimed that they were iconoclasts, rejecting the veneration of images and the Cross, that they used fire rather than water in baptism, and that they had a relatively simple conception of priesthood. The practice of baptism by fire by Paulicians in the region before their conversion to Catholicism is corroborated by the contemporary English diplomat Paul Rycaut.

== Historiography ==
In the 1940s, Soviet scholars saw the sect primarily as a product of proletarian revolt which found expression through a theological movement. Garsoïan agreed that this assertion is supported by both Greek and Armenian sources, but held it only a limited description of the sect.

== See also ==
- Athinganoi
- Albigensians
- Banat Bulgarians
- Banat Bulgarian dialect
- Bogomilism
- Edmund Hamer Broadbent - The Pilgrim Church
- Novgorod Codex
- Paulician dialect
- Pavlikeni
- Restorationism
- Roman Catholicism in Bulgaria
- Tondrakians

== Bibliography ==
- Arpee, Leon (April 1906). "Armenian Paulicianism and the Key of Truth". The American Journal of Theology. 10 (2). Chicago: University of Chicago Press: 267–285. doi:10.1086/478607. JSTOR 3153904.
- Garsoïan, Nina G. (2011) [1967]. The Paulician Heresy: A Study of the origin and development of Paulicianism in Armenia and the Eastern Provinces of the Byzantine Empire. Publications in Near and Middle East Studies: Series A. Vol. 6. Berlin: De Gruyter. doi:10.1515/9783111344522. ISBN 9783110992274.
- Runciman, Steven (2009) [1982]. "CHAPTER III - The Paulicians". The Medieval Manichee: A Study of the Christian Dualist Heresy. Cambridge: Cambridge University Press. pp. 26–62. doi:10.1017/CBO9780511599514.003. ISBN 9780511599514.
- Seyfeli, Canan (August 2020). "Byzantine Paulicians: Beliefs and Practices (Bizans Pavlikyanları: İnanç ve Pratikler)". ULUM: Journal of Religious Inquiries. 3 (1). Ankara: ULUM İslami İlimler Eğitim ve Araştırma Merkezi: 45–68. eISSN 2645-9132 – via ResearchGate.
- Yianni Cartledge & Brenton Griffin, ‘Sunk in the…Gulf of Perdition’: The ‘Heretical’ Paulician and Tondrakian Movements in the Periphery of the Medieval Byzantine Empire', Cerae, 9, 2022, 235-271.
