= Al-Awasim =

Muslim fortifications

Thughur and Awasim
- اَلـثُّـغُـوْر وَالْـعَـوَاصِـم al-thughūr wa-l-ʿawāṣim
- Cilicia, northern Syria and Upper Mesopotamia

Site information
- Type: Fortified border zone
- Controlled by: Abbasid Caliphate (750s–c. 930), Ikhshidids (c. 935–940s), Hamdanids (940s–962s), Mamluks of Egypt (14th century–1516)

Site history
- Built: 8th century
- Built by: Abbasid Caliphate, Mamluk Sultanate of Egypt
- In use: c. 750s–c. 962s, 14th century–1514

Garrison information
- Garrison: 25,000 in c. 780

Al-ʿAwāṣim (Arabic: العواصم, "the defences, fortifications"; sing. al-ʿāṣimah, اَلْـعَـاصِـمَـة, "protectress") was the Arabic term used to refer to the Muslim side of the frontier zone between the Byzantine Empire and the Umayyad and Abbasid Caliphates in Cilicia, northern Syria and Upper Mesopotamia. It was established in the early 8th century, once the first wave of the Muslim conquests ebbed, and lasted until the mid-10th century, when the Byzantine advance overran it. It comprised the forward marches, comprising a chain of fortified strongholds, known as al-thughūr (اَلـثُّـغُـوْر; sing. al-thaghr, اَلـثَّـغْـر, "cleft, opening"), and the rear or inner regions of the frontier zone, which was known as al-ʿawāṣim proper. On the Byzantine side, the Muslim marches were mirrored by the institution of the kleisourai and the akritai (border guards).

The term thughūr was also used in the marches of al-Andalus and Transoxiana, and was revived by the Mamluk Sultanate in the 14th century, when the areas traditionally comprising the ʿawāṣim and thughūr in the northern Syrian region and Upper Mesopotamia came under their control.

== Arab–Byzantine frontier zone ==
=== Creation of the frontier zone ===
Already from late 630s, after the rapid Muslim conquest of the Levant, a vast zone unclaimed by either Byzantines or Arabs and virtually deserted (known in Arabic as al-Ḍawāḥī (اَلـدَّوَاحِي, "of the Outer Lands") and in Greek as ta akra (τὰ ἄκρα, "the extremities") emerged between the two powers in Cilicia, along the southern approaches of the Taurus and Anti-Taurus ranges, leaving Anatolia in Byzantine hands. Both Emperor Heraclius (r. 610–641) and the Caliph ʿUmar (r. 634–644) pursued a strategy of destruction within this zone, trying to transform it into an effective barrier between their realms.

Nevertheless, the ultimate aim of the caliphs remained the outright conquest of Byzantium, as they had done with its provinces in Syria, Egypt and North Africa. It was only the failure of the 717–18 Siege of Constantinople that forced a revision of this strategic objective: although raids into Anatolia continued, the goal of conquest was abandoned. The border between the two powers began to acquire more permanent features. For the next two centuries, border fortresses might change hands between Byzantines and Arabs, but the basic outline of the Arab–Byzantine border remained essentially unaltered. Thus the term al-thughūr, which initially meant "fissures, clefts" (cf. their Greek name ta Stomia, τὰ Στόμια, "the mouths/openings") and designated the actual borderlands, came to mean "boundaries", employed in phrases like Thughūr al-Islām (ثُـغُـوْر الْإِسْـلَام, "Boundary of Islam") or Thughūr al-Rūmiyya (الثُّغُور الرُّومِيَّة, "Boundary of the Rūm").

Map of the Byzantine-Arab frontier zone in southeastern Anatolia, with the major fortresses

This process was marked by a gradual consolidation of the previously deserted zone and its transformation into a settled and fortified borderland, especially after the Byzantines abandoned Cilicia during the reign of Caliph Abd al-Malik ibn Marwan (r. 685–705). The Muslims began to move into the area, reoccupying and repairing the abandoned towns and forts. The process started under the Umayyads, but intensified under the first Abbasids, especially during the rule of Harun al-Rashid (r. 786–809). Thus a line of forts was gradually established, stretching from Tarsus (Ar. Ṭarsūs) on the Mediterranean coast to Malatya (Ar. Malaṭiyā, Gr. Melitene) and Kemah (Arabic Ḥiṣn Kamkh) on the upper course of the Euphrates. These were located at strategic choke points at the intersections of major roads or at the mouths of important passes.

=== Administrative organization and settlements ===
The entire frontier zone was initially part of the jund (one of the military administrative divisions into which Muslim Syria was divided) of Homs. After 680 it formed part of the new jund of Qinnasrin (Gr. Chalkis), until Harun al-Rashid established a separate jund al-ʿAwāṣim (جُـنْـد الْـعَـوَاصِـم) in 786, covering the entire region from the Byzantine border in the north and west to the Euphrates in the east and a line running south of Antioch (Ar. Anṭākiya), Aleppo (Ar. Ḥalab, Gr. Berroia) and Manbij (Gr. Hierapolis). Manbij and later Antioch were the new province's capitals. The al-ʿAwāṣim proper served as the second defensive line behind the Thughūr, stretching across northern Syria and comprising the towns of Baghras, Bayās, Dulūk (Gr. Doliche or Telouch), Alexandretta (Ar. Iskandarīya), Cyrrhus (Ar. Qūrus), Ra'bān and Tīzīn. The Thughūr, the actual frontier zone, was divided into the Cilician or Syrian (al-Thughūr al-Sha'mīya, اَلـثُّـغُـوْر الـشَّـأْمِـيَّـة) and the Jaziran or Mesopotamian (al-Thughūr al-Jazīrīya, اَلـثُّـغُـوْر الْـجَـزِيْـرِيَّـة) sectors, roughly separated by the Amanus mountains. There was no overall governor or administrative centre for the Thughūr, although Tarsus and Malatya emerged as the most important towns in Cilicia and the Mesopotamian sector respectively. The towns of the Thughūr came variously under the administrative control of the jund al-ʿAwāṣim or functioned as separate districts; the situation is complicated by the fact that by the 10th century, the terms Thughūr and al-ʿAwāṣim were often used interchangeably in the sources. In addition, from the early 10th century, with the Byzantine advance into Armenia, the frontier around Diyār Bakr became a third sector, al-Thughūr al-Bakrīya (الـثُّـغُـوْر الـبَـكْـرِيَّـة).

In the Cilician sector, Mopsuestia (Ar. al-Maṣṣīṣa) was the first city to be re-occupied and garrisoned, already under the Umayyads, who settled 300 soldiers there in 703, a number raised under the first Abbasids to some 4,000. Adana followed in 758–760, and Tarsus in 787/8. Tarsus quickly became the largest settlement in the region and the Arabs' most important base of operations against the Byzantines, counting between 4,000 and 5,000 troops in its garrison. Other important fortresses in Cilicia, which however were little more than military outposts, were 'Ayn Zarba (Gr. Anazarbus), al-Hārūniya, founded by Harun al-Rashid, Tall Gubair and al-Kanīsat al-Sawdā. These were complemented by smaller forts dotted across the Cilician plain, holding smaller garrisons of a dozen or so men. In the more mountainous terrain of the Mesopotamian frontier zone, the main strongholds were located in the fertile parts of relatively isolated valleys, controlling the entrances of passes over the mountains: Mar'ash (Gr. Germanikeia), rebuilt already under Muawiyah I (r. 661–680) and again under Harun al-Rashid, al-Ḥadath (Gr. Adata), likewise refortified by the first Abbasid caliphs and provided with 4,000 troops, and Malatya, which had been colonized by the Umayyads, destroyed by the Byzantines and rebuilt again and likewise garrisoned with 4,000 men in 757/8. Further fortresses of lesser importance in the Mesopotamian sector were Salaghus, Kaisum, Ḥiṣn Zibaṭra (Gr. Zapetra/Sozopetra), Sumaisaṭ (Gr. Samosata), Ḥiṣn Qalawdhiya and Ḥiṣn Ziyad. Some of the northern fortresses of the al-ʿAwāṣim province, like Dulūk or Cyrrhus, were also sometimes included in it. Further north, the relatively isolated fortress towns of Qālīqalā (Gr. Theodosiopolis, modern Erzurum) and Kamacha formed the northernmost outposts of Muslim rule. The Thughūr al-Bakrīya included, according to Qudama ibn Ja'far, Sumaisaṭ, Ḥānī, Malikyan, Gamah, Ḥaurān and al-Kilis.

"...from all the great towns within the borders of Persia and Mesopotamia, and Arabia, Syria, Egypt, and Morocco, there is no city but has in Tarsus a hostelry for its townsmen, where the warriors for the Faith from each particular country live. And, when they have once reached Tarsus, they settle there and remain to serve in the garrison; among them prayer and worship are most diligently performed; from all hands, funds are sent to them, and they receive alms rich and plentiful; also there is hardly a sultan who does not send hither some auxiliary troops."

— Ibn Hawqal's description of Tarsus as a centre for jihad against Byzantium

The caliphs repopulated the area by bringing in colonists and regular soldiers from Syria but also Persians, Slavs, Arab Christians, and people from the eastern edges of the Muslim world: settlers from Khurasan, the Sayābija tribe or Jatts (Ar. Zuṭṭ) from India. The regular troops stationed there were favoured with lower taxes (the tithe or ʿushr instead of the kharāj land tax), higher pay and small land grants (qaṭā'i). In early Abbasid times these troops numbered some 25,000, half of them drawn from Khurasan and the rest from Syria and Upper Mesopotamia. They were complemented by volunteers, drawn by the religious motivation of jihad against the Byzantines but often paid a salary by the state as well. All this entailed a heavy financial burden on the Abbasid government. Under Harun al-Rashid, taxation from the Cilician sector brought in 100,000 gold dinars every year, which were all spent locally for public works, salaries, espionage etc. In addition, the costs of cross-border expeditions typically ranged between 200,000 and 300,000 dinars annually. The Mesopotamian sector's revenue amounted to some 70,000 dinars, to which the central government added 120,000–170,000 dinars each year for the upkeep of the fortifications and the salary of the frontier troops.

=== Military operations ===
By the 9th century, the Arab raiding expeditions launched against Byzantium from the frontier zone had gradually assumed an almost ritual character and were strictly organized. According to Qudama ibn Ja'far, the conventional pattern of Arab incursions included a first expedition in spring (10 May–10 June), when horses could find abundant fodder, followed after about a month's rest by a summer raid (10 July–8 September), usually the main campaign of the year, and sometimes by a winter raid in February–March. The importance of these raids is summarized by Islamic scholar Hugh N. Kennedy: "the ṣāʿifa (summer raid) was as much a part of the symbolic and ritual functions of the Caliph as was organising and providing leadership for the annual hajj to Mecca".

The frontier zone was fiercely contested between the Arabs and the Byzantines. Raids and counter-raids were a permanent fixture of this type of warfare. Forts on either side of the notional frontier were captured and razed, or sometimes occupied, but never for long. As a result, the region was often depopulated, necessitating repeated resettlement. There is nevertheless evidence of some prosperity, based on agriculture and commerce, especially during the second half of the 9th century, when the borderlands became a node in a commercial route linking Basra with northern Syria and even Constantinople. After 842 and for most of the later 9th century, the decline of Abbasid power meant that control over the Thughūr gradually devolved to semi-independent border emirates, chiefly Tarsus, Malatya and Qālīqalā, which were left largely to fend on their own against a resurgent Byzantium. The Battle of Lalakaon in 863 broke the power of Malatya, altering the balance of power in the region, and signalled the beginning of a gradual Byzantine encroachment on the Arab borderlands.

With the onset of the Abbasid Caliphate's terminal period of crisis after 928, control of the Muslim frontier cities shifted to the Ikhshidid and Hamdanid dynasties. In the 930s, under the leadership of John Kourkouas, the Byzantines broke through and conquered Malatya and most of the Mesopotamian sector of the Thughūr. Although the Hamdanid emir of Aleppo, Sayf al-Dawla (r. 946–967), managed to stem the Byzantine advance, his success was only temporary: in 964–965, Emperor Nikephoros II Phokas (r. 963–969) captured Cilicia, followed soon after by Antioch, while the Hamdanids of Aleppo became a tributary state.

== Mamluk–Turkmen frontier zone ==
After their conquest of Syria in the late 13th century, the Egyptian Mamluks re-established the al-thughūr wa-l-ʿawāṣim as a defensive zone to shield Syria from the Turkoman states of Asia Minor and the Caucasus, including at a later stage the Ottoman Empire. Like the earlier model, the thughūr were divided into a Syrian and a Mesopotamian march, as well as a rear zone along northern Syria. The Mamluks entrusted the defence of the Syrian/Cilician march to the client Turkmen principality of the Ramadanids, while the Dulkadirid principality fulfilled the same role in the Mesopotamian thughūr. To safeguard their control of the frontier zone, and to keep the two client beyliks separated and under control, the Mamluks also retained garrisons in seven strategically important sites: Tarsus, Ayas, Serfendikar, Sis, Darende, Malatya and Divriği. Ahmad al-Qalqashandi gives the subdivisions (niyābāt) of the Mamluk thughūr as follows: eight for the Syrian sector (Malatya, Divriği, Darende, Elbistan, Ayas, Tarsus and Adana, Serfendikar and Sis) and three on the Euphrates sector (al-Bira, Qal'at Ja'bar and al-Ruha).

== See also ==
- Ghazi (warrior)
- Ribāṭs, early fortified sites used by ghazis
- Karbeas
- Al-Awasim was the setting for several heroic epics, including those of:
  - Delhemma
  - Battal Gazi (inspired by the historical Abdallah al-Battal
  - Digenes Akritas

== Sources ==
- Canard, M. (1960). "al-ʿAwāṣim". In Gibb, H. A. R.; Kramers, J. H.; Lévi-Provençal, E.; Schacht, J.; Lewis, B. & Pellat, Ch. (eds.). The Encyclopaedia of Islam, Second Edition. Volume I: A–B. Leiden: E. J. Brill. pp. 761–762. OCLC 495469456.
- El-Cheikh, Nadia Maria (2004). Byzantium Viewed by the Arabs. Cambridge, Massachusetts: Harvard Center for Middle Eastern Studies. ISBN 0-932885-30-6.
- Har-El, Shai (1995). Struggle for Domination in the Middle East: The Ottoman-Mamluk War, 1485–91. BRILL. ISBN 978-90-04-10180-7.
- Vasiliev, Alexander A.; Grégoire, Henri; Canard, Marius; Honigmann, Ernst [in German] (1935–1968). Byzance et les Arabes. Corpus Bruxellense Historiae Byzantinae (in French). Vol. 1–3 (in 4 volumes). Brussels: Institut de philologie et d'histoire orientales et slaves & Fondation Byzantine.
- Honigmann, E. (1987) [1927]. "AL-THUGHŪR". In Houtsma, Martijn Theodoor (ed.). E.J. Brill's First Encyclopaedia of Islam, 1913–1936, Volume VIII: Ṭa'if–Zūrkhāna. Leiden: BRILL. pp. 738–739. ISBN 90-04-08265-4.
- Kaegi, Walter Emil (1995). Byzantium and the Early Islamic Conquests. Cambridge: Cambridge University Press. ISBN 978-0-521-48455-8.
- Kazhdan, Alexander, ed. (1991). The Oxford Dictionary of Byzantium. Oxford and New York: Oxford University Press. ISBN 0-19-504652-8.
- Kennedy, Hugh (2001). The Armies of the Caliphs: Military and Society in the Early Islamic State. London and New York: Routledge. ISBN 0-415-25093-5.
- Streck, Maximilian (1987) [1927]. "AL-ʿAWĀṢIM". In Houtsma, Martijn Theodoor (ed.). E.J. Brill's First Encyclopaedia of Islam, 1913–1936, Volume I: A–Bābā Beg. Leiden: BRILL. pp. 515–516. ISBN 90-04-08265-4.
- Toynbee, Arnold (1973). Constantine Porphyrogenitus and His World. Oxford University Press. ISBN 0-19-215253-X.
- Vasiliev, Alexander A. (1935). Byzance et les Arabes, Tome I: La dynastie d'Amorium (820–867). Corpus Bruxellense Historiae Byzantinae (in French). Vol. 1. French ed.: Henri Grégoire, Marius Canard. Brussels: Éditions de l'Institut de philologie et d'histoire orientales.
- Wheatley, Paul (2000). The Places Where Men Pray Together: Cities in Islamic Lands, Seventh Through the Tenth Centuries. University of Chicago Press. ISBN 978-0-226-89428-7.
- Whittow, Mark (1996). The Making of Byzantium, 600–1025. Berkeley and Los Angeles, California: University of California Press. ISBN 978-0-520-20496-6.
