= Mark Whittow =

British historian and archaeologist (1957–2017)

- Born: 24 August 1957; Cambridge, United Kingdom
- Died: 23 December 2017 (aged 60); Oxfordshire, United Kingdom

Academic background
- Education: Trinity College, Oxford (BA, DPhil)
- Thesis: Social and Political Structures in the Maeander Region of Western Asia Minor on the Eve of the Turkish Invasions (1987)
- Doctoral advisor: James Howard-Johnston

Academic work
- Institutions: University of Reading; King's College London; University of Oxford (1998–2017)
- Notable works: The Making of Orthodox Byzantium, 600–1025

Mark Whittow (24 August 1957 – 23 December 2017) was a British historian, archaeologist, and academic, specialising in the Byzantine Empire. He was a university lecturer at the University of Oxford and a Fellow in Byzantine Studies at Corpus Christi College, Oxford.

== Early life and education ==
Whittow was born in Cambridge. He attended Lord Wandsworth College in Long Sutton, Hampshire. He began reading modern history in 1976 at Trinity College, Oxford, and in 1987 earned a D.Phil. in Byzantine history and archaeology.

== Academic career ==
Whittow was a research fellow and lecturer at Oriel College and held faculty positions at the University of Reading and at King's College London, before returning to Oxford in 1998 as a fellow of St Peter's College and University Lecturer in History. He became a fellow of Corpus Christi and University Lecturer in Byzantine Studies in 2009. He was Senior Proctor of the university for the 2016/2017 academic year. In November 2017, he was announced as the next Provost of Oriel College, Oxford; he was to take up the post in September 2018.

== Personal life ==
Whittow was married to Helen Malcolm, a QC and Deputy High Court Judge.

He died in a car accident in Oxfordshire on the evening of 23 December 2017, aged 60.

== Selected works ==
- The Making of Orthodox Byzantium, 600–1025 (Basingstoke: Macmillan, 1996) ISBN 9781349247653
- 'Recent Research on the Late Antique City in Asia Minor: the Second Half of the 6th c. Revisited', in Recent Research in Late Antique Urbanism, ed. L. Lavan, JRA Supplementary Series 42 (Portsmouth, RI: Journal of Roman Archaeology, 2001), pp. 137–53 ISBN 1887829423
- 'Early Medieval Byzantium and the End of the Ancient World', Journal of Agrarian Change 9 (2009), pp. 134–53
- 'The Middle Byzantine Economy (600–1204)', in The Cambridge History of the Byzantine Empire, ed. J. Shepard (Cambridge: Cambridge University Press, 2009), pp. 465–92
- 'The Late Roman/Early Byzantine Near East', in The New Cambridge History of Islam I, ed. C. Robinson (Cambridge: Cambridge University Press, 2010), pp. 72–97
- (ed. with Marc Lauxtermann) Byzantium in the Eleventh Century: Being in Between. Papers from the 45th Spring Symposium of Byzantine Studies, Exeter College, Oxford, 24–26 March 2012 (London: Routledge, 2017) ISBN 9781138225039
