= Byzantium in the Crusading movement =

Role of the Byzantine Empire in the Crusades

The Byzantine Empire participated in the crusading movement from its inception in the late 11th century, serving as initiator, ally, and adversary. The Byzantines regarded their state as the continuation of the Roman Empire and the centre of the civilised world, although it had lost substantial territories during the early Muslim conquests. The empire recovered some territory after c. 960, but from the mid-11th century faced sustained pressure from several directions, including nomadic Turkomans in Anatolia.

Despite strained relations with Western Christendom after the East–West Schism (1054), the Byzantine emperor Alexios I Komnenos sought Western aid, prompting Pope Urban II to proclaim the First Crusade in 1095. Cooperation proved difficult: although the crusaders helped recover parts of Anatolia, they founded four states on former Byzantine lands and often blamed the "schismatic" Byzantines for later failures. Byzantine influence in the Crusader states nevertheless grew as Muslim power in Syria expanded under the Zengids and later Saladin; Manuel I Komnenos extended Byzantine suzerainty over the Principality of Antioch and the Kingdom of Jerusalem and supported joint campaigns against Egypt.

Byzantine actions against Westerners and negotiations with Saladin increased Western resentment. Although plans for a crusader attack on Constantinople had long existed, the city did not fall until the Fourth Crusade, largely due to internal Byzantine conflicts. The Sack of Constantinople and the establishment of the Latin Empire on former Byzantine territory in 1204 deepened the rift between Western and Eastern Christians. Byzantine successor states, particularly Nicaea, led the resistance to Latin rule and restored the empire under Michael VIII Palaiologos in 1261. Later Western plans to reconquer Constantinople, though supported by the papacy, had failed by 1320.

Late Byzantine rulers sought Western aid against Ottoman expansion through alliances, papal negotiations, and church union, but civil wars, anti-Latin sentiment, and Ottoman military successes repeatedly frustrated crusading plans. Western expeditions brought only limited relief before the Fall of Constantinople in 1453. Mutual suspicion between Byzantines and crusaders shaped contemporary narratives and later historiography, while the Fourth Crusade left enduring cultural trauma and a mixed artistic and literary legacy.

== Background ==
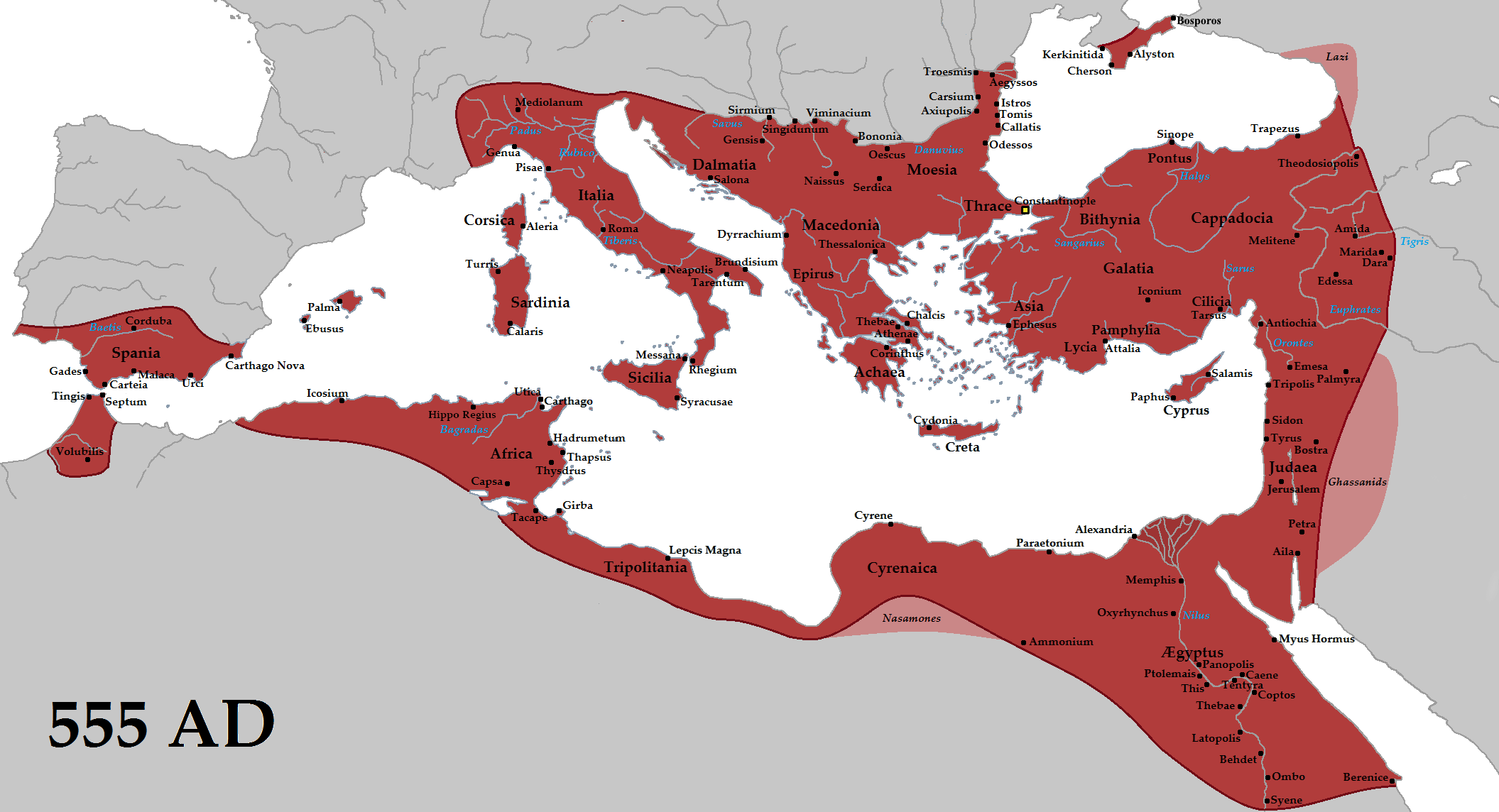
Byzantine Empire under Emperor Justinian I (c. 555)

The Byzantine Empire was, as the historian Peter Lock observes, "in every sense the heir and embodiment of the Roman Empire", which had been divided into eastern and western halves in 395. The eastern emperors ruled from Constantinople, refounded in 330 by the first Christian emperor, Constantine the Great, on the site of Byzantium. After the Fall of the Western Roman Empire in 476, Byzantine rulers expressed their claim to universal authority through the concept of translatio imperii (Note: In Byzantine perception, Constantine the Great's decision to reside in Constantinople rendered the city the centre of power in Christendom, effectively a new Rome and Jerusalem.) and the title "Emperor and Autocrat of the Romans". Byzantines called themselves Rhomaioi ('Romans') and associated their empire with the Oikoumene, or the civilized world, regarding it as something more than a merely temporal realm.

The emperors were widely regarded as God's representatives on earth. The Church was organised around five major episcopal sees, each headed by a patriarch. Among them, the bishops of Rome, styled popes, enjoyed honorary primacy but were expected to act as imperial officials. The Byzantine state was administered by an educated bureaucratic elite; many were eunuchs, who were ineligible to the imperial throne. In foreign affairs, Byzantium favoured diplomacy, using wealth, titles, and elaborate ceremonies to manage rivals, but remained ready to resort to warfare when necessary.

Byzantine power declined under pressure from enemies, including the Sasanians and Avars. From the 630s, the empire proved unable to resist the expansion of the first Islamic Caliphate and lost the Middle East, Egypt, and North Africa. Islam arose under Muhammad, whose revelations formed the Quran, regarded as God's final message. Early Muslim expansion was encouraged by Quranic promises of afterlife reward for participation in jihad, or holy war. As a result, the patriarchates of Antioch, Alexandria, and Jerusalem came under Muslim rule, leaving only Rome and Constantinople under Christian control. Muslim rulers classified Christians as dhimmis, protected yet legally subordinate.

In Western Europe, former Roman territories fragmented into smaller kingdoms ruled largely by Germanic elites. Under the Carolingians, the Franks reunited vast regions that had been part of the Western Roman Empire. Cooperation between the papacy and the Carolingians grew amid tensions with Byzantium, including disputes over Byzantine iconoclasm. In 800, Pope Leo III crowned the Frankish king Charlemagne emperor. Although the iconoclasm ended, Western adoption of the filioque clause in the Nicene Creed (Note: Mainstream Christian theologians upheld the doctrine of the Trinity, according to which God is one in three persons: Father, Son, and Holy Spirit. Eastern Christians maintained that the Holy Spirit proceeded from the Father. By contrast, the Third Council of Toledo in Hispania declared that the Spirit proceeded from the Father and the Son (589), giving rise to the filioque ('and the Son') doctrine. After its adoption by the Council of Aachen (809) within the Carolingian Empire, and its endorsement at Rome (1014), the formula marked the first clear theological divergence between the papacy and the Byzantines.) deepened divisions with Eastern Christianity. By the mid-ninth century, the Carolingian Empire had divided into smaller, decentralised states, including France and Germany. A renewed imperial project emerged under the German king Otto I, crowned emperor in 962, but the Holy Roman Empire, encompassing Germany and much of Italy, remained politically fractured. The diffusion of authority in the West, amid endemic violence and instability, contributed to the rise of a mounted warrior elite later known as knights. This Western elite produced large numbers of younger, landless men-at-arms seeking to exploit the unsettled conditions prevailing along the borderlands of Catholic Europe.

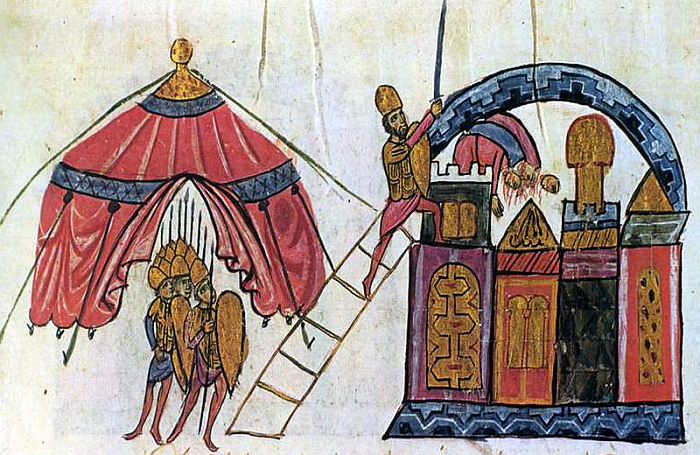
Siege of Antioch (968–969) (from the 12th-century Madrid Skylitzes manuscript)

After 963, the Byzantine Empire entered a renewed phase of expansion as the weakening of the Abbasid Caliphate enabled the recovery of the islands of Crete (961) and Cyprus (965) and the cities of Antioch (969) and Edessa (1031). Although emperors sought to present their campaigns against Muslim powers as holy wars, the concept remained alien to Byzantine theology. (Note: Emperor Nikephoros II Phokas even proposed that Byzantine soldiers slain in combat against Muslims be accorded martyr status; this was, however, rejected by a synod under Patriarch Polyeuctus of Constantinople, which cited the theologian Basil of Caesarea's teaching that those who killed in war should refrain from communion for three years, since "their hands are not clean".) From 1027, treaties with the Fatimid Caliphate—the Abbasids' rivals—recognised the emperors as protectors of Christians and confirmed their right to appoint the patriarchs of Jerusalem. Military success encouraged economic growth in the empire, while Constantinople prospered through its position on major trade routes. With a population of more than 350,000, it ranked among the world's largest cities. Commercial contacts with Western Europe revived, largely through merchants from the Italian city-states, notably Venice, Pisa, and Genoa.

== Prelude to the First Crusade ==
At the death of the conquering emperor Basil II in 1025, Byzantium dominated south-eastern Europe and the Middle East; yet within fifty years, it faced recurrent economic crises and invasions. Explanations for this decline include weakened central authority, institutional shortcomings, and intellectual stagnation. Meanwhile, cold spells across the Eurasian steppes displaced Turkic groups: the Pechenegs crossed the Danube, while Seljuk-led Turkomans established control over the Abbasid Caliphate (Note: Following the Turkoman conquest of Khorasan and Iran, the Seljuk leader Tughril Beg seized Baghdad, the Abbasid capital, and was invested with the title of sultan in 1055 by the caliph al-Qa'im, which legitimised his rule in Iran and Iraq.) and raided Anatolia. They also seized Antioch and Edessa.

From the 1040s, Norman warlords attacked papal and Byzantine territories in Italy, prompting Pope Leo IX to seek an alliance with Byzantium despite ecclesiastical tensions. Yet, in 1054, disputes over liturgical practice (Note: The nature of the bread used in the Eucharist, a central rite of Christian liturgy, lay at the heart of the dispute: the Byzantines employed leavened bread and rejected the Western use of unleavened bread as a Jewish practice.) and Byzantine concerns about the encroachment of Western customs upon the Greeks of southern Italy culminated in mutual excommunications. This rupture coincided with the Gregorian Reform, which strengthened papal authority in Western Europe. Thereafter, Western Christians conceived the respublica christiana—the Christian world—as divided between two empires, one under the Western "Emperor of the Romans" and the other under the Eastern "Emperor of the Greeks", but ultimately to be united under the authority of the papacy.

Europe on the eve of the Battle of Manzikert

Following the Schism of 1054, Byzantine–papal relations fluctuated. Although Pope Stephen IX sought reconciliation, Nicholas II allied with the Normans. A Byzantine embassy to Rome in 1062 reportedly mentioned an expedition to Jerusalem, suggesting Byzantine awareness of growing Western enthusiasm for the Holy City. Meanwhile, Turkoman pressure intensified, culminating in a Byzantine defeat by the Seljuk sultan Alp Arslan at the Battle of Manzikert in 1071. The ensuing civil war facilitated Turkoman settlement in Anatolia. Renewed contacts with the West included dynastic ties and Pope Gregory VII's plan for a papally led expedition, but this was disrupted by the Investiture Controversy between the papacy and Western rulers.

In 1081, Alexios I Komnenos seized the throne. He secured Venetian naval support against the Normans through commercial concessions and also restored control over the Danube frontier. By then, Anatolia had fragmented into rival Turkoman polities, such as the Sultanate of Rum and the Danishmendids. Although initially excommunicated by Gregory VII, Alexios maintained diplomatic relations with Western powers because Western mercenaries were central to Byzantine armies. (Note: From late Roman times, the Byzantines regularly hired mercenaries, but their role expanded owing to imperial fears of rebellion by provincial generals. From the late tenth century, Rus' and Turkic troops predominated, but frequent desertions among the latter encouraged reliance on Western mercenaries.) To forestall a Byzantine alliance with his opponents, the new pope, Urban II, absolved Alexios of the excommunication. In 1095, Alexios sent envoys to Urban at the Council of Piacenza to seek military assistance. At that time, as the Byzantinist Ralph-Johannes Lilie observes, the papacy was the only Western power with "a vital interest" in assisting Byzantium.

== First Crusade ==
=== Council of Clermont ===
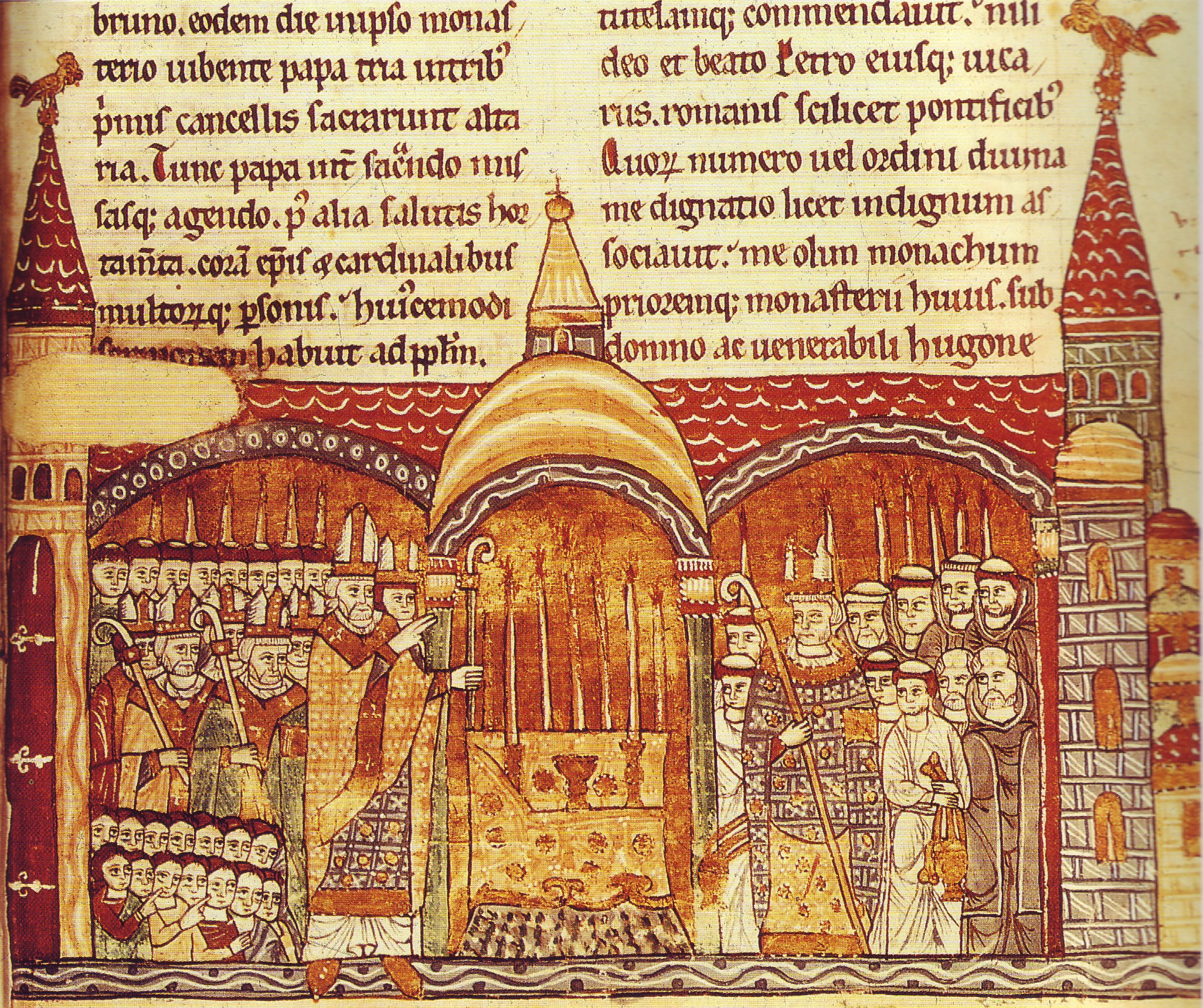
Pope Urban II consecrates the altar in Cluny Abbey during his 1095 visit to France (from the 12th- or 13th-century Miscellanea secundum usum ordinis Cluniacensis).

Shortly after the Council of Piacenza, Pope Urban II travelled to France on a preaching campaign culminating in the proclamation of the First Crusade at the Council of Clermont on 27 November 1095. He presented the expedition as an armed act of penance, promising spiritual rewards to ease knights' troubled consciences and prompting many to "take the cross", sewing cloth crosses onto their robes. Although Urban stressed the defence of eastern Christians, for most participants the liberation of Jerusalem became the chief aim.

Emperor Alexios I likely expected a controllable force, but Urban's appeal aroused unexpected enthusiasm, which led to the formation of several armies that modern estimates place at 30,000–70,000 armed men, with perhaps over 100,000 if non-combatants are taken into account. Urban set 15 August 1096 as the departure date, and instructed the crusaders to assemble at Constantinople. Given little time to prepare, Byzantine authorities were alarmed by the large forces beyond imperial control. They adopted what the Byzantinist Jonathan Harris calls a "carrot and stick" strategy: escorting the crusaders with imperial troops while supplying provisions. As most came from lands formerly within the Carolingian Empire, the Byzantines called the crusaders Frangoi ('Franks').

=== People's Crusade ===
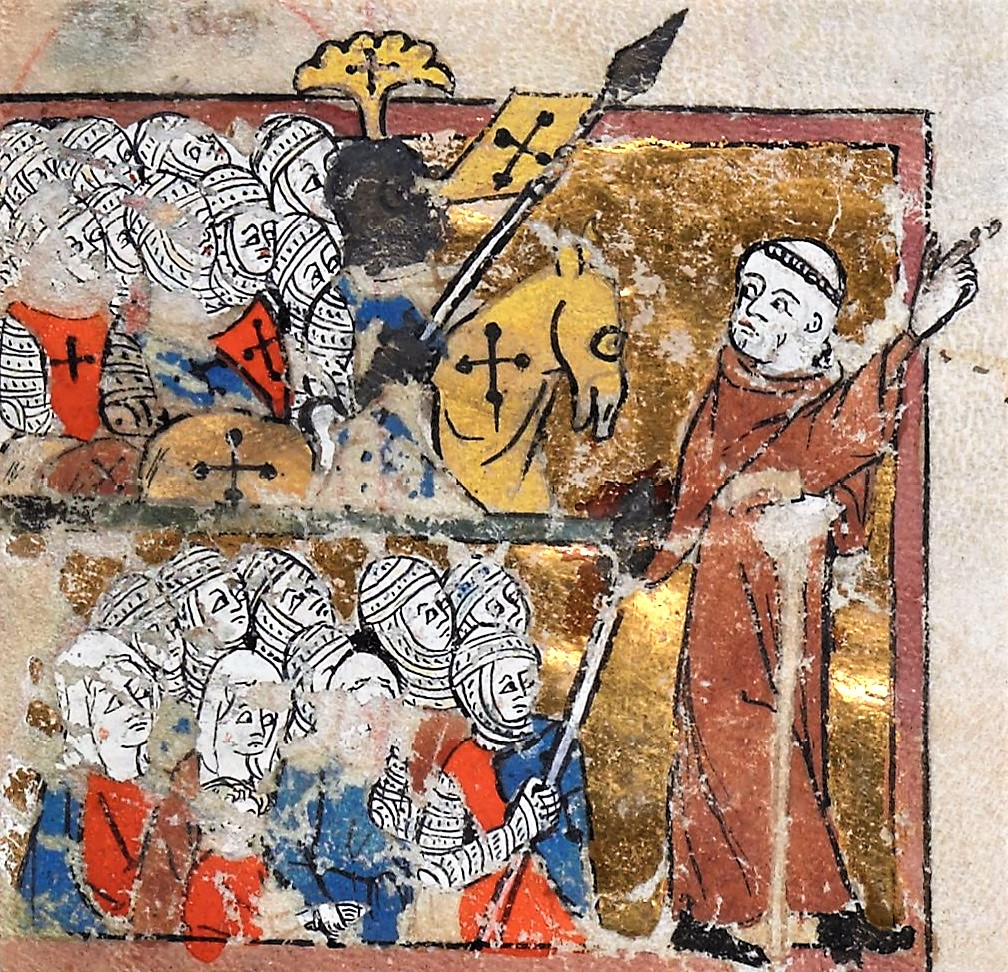
Peter the Hermit leads the People's Crusade (14th-century manuscript of the Abreujamen de las estorias).

Meanwhile, Peter the Hermit, a charismatic preacher, organised a recruitment movement in northern France and eastern Germany. By March 1096, he had gathered over 10,000 largely ill-equipped followers from varied social backgrounds. The expedition travelled in two contingents. The first, led by the knight Walter Sans Avoir, reached Constantinople without serious incident. The second, led by Peter, clashed with Byzantine forces at Niš over supplies before arriving on 1 August. The crusaders' plundering of the suburbs prompted Alexios to move them into Anatolia. They were almost entirely destroyed by Kilij Arslan I, Sultan of Rum, at the Battle of Civetot on 21 October 1096.

=== Princes' Crusade ===
The official crusading armies entered Byzantine territory from several directions between October 1096 and April 1097. Hugh of Vermandois's fleet was destroyed by a storm near Dyrrachium, and following his disembarkation, he was taken into custody by the city's Byzantine governor. Other armies, led by Bohemond of Taranto, Godfrey of Bouillon, and Raymond IV of Toulouse, made their passage under the supervision of Pecheneg mercenaries. Byzantine authorities intercepted communications between the crusading armies and required them to camp outside Constantinople. Skirmishes between crusaders and Byzantine troops were frequent, and Bohemond even proposed attacking Constantinople. Emperor Alexios required the Frankish leaders to swear oaths to restore former Byzantine territories. Though some resisted, most complied.

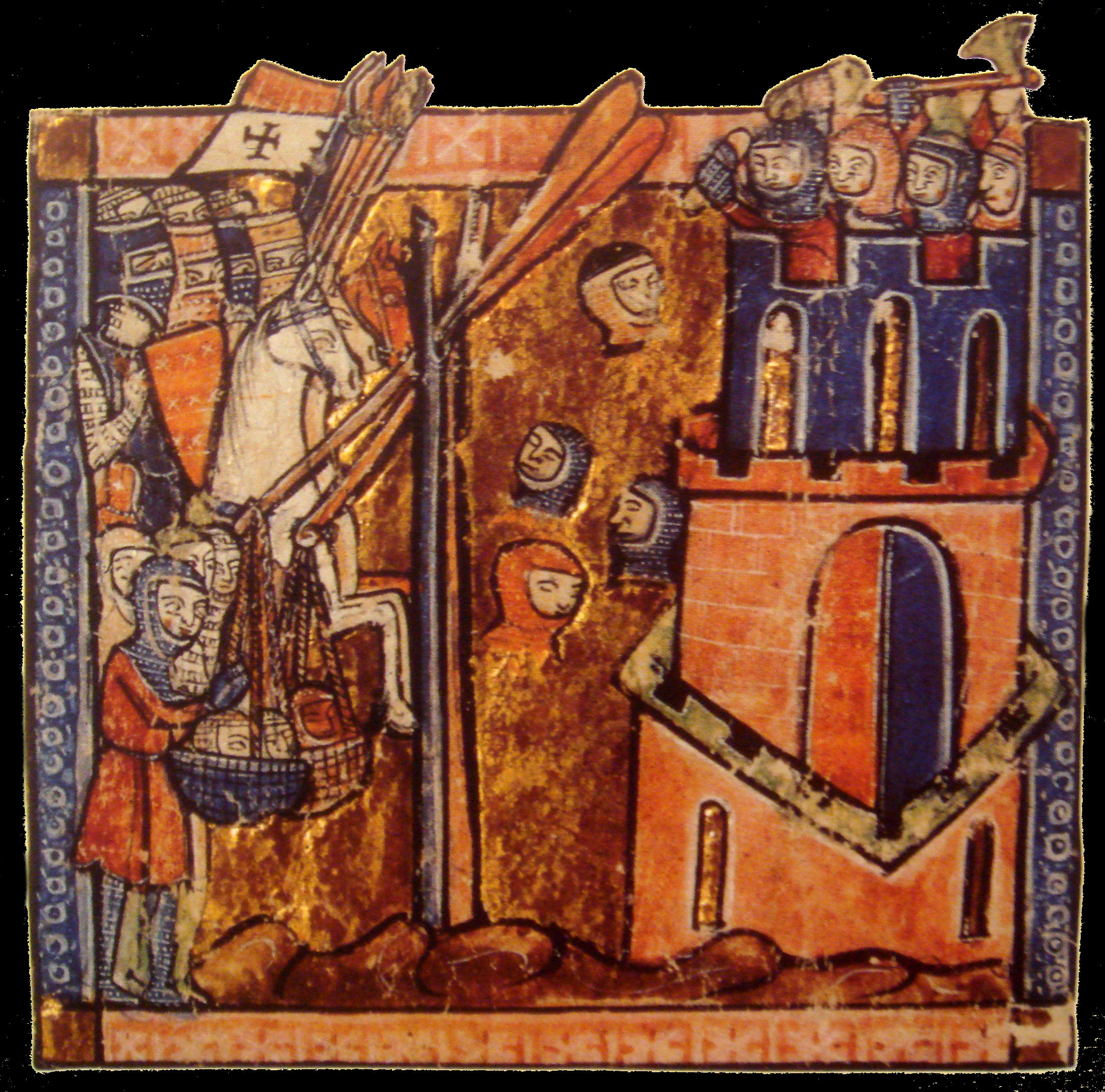
The Siege of Nicaea during the First Crusade (from a 13th-century manuscript of William of Tyre's chronicle)

Between February and April 1097, the armies were transported to Anatolia. In May, they besieged Nicaea and defeated a Turkoman relief force led by Kilij Arslan. After eight weeks, a Byzantine flotilla cut the defenders' supply lines, forcing them to surrender to Alexios. The fall of Nicaea opened the route to Antioch. Alexios declined direct command and appointed his general Tatikios to accompany the army. The campaign weakened the Turkomans in western Anatolia and aided the Byzantine recovery of cities including Smyrna and Ephesos.

After defeating a Turkoman force at the Battle of Dorylaeum on 1 July, the crusaders captured several Cappadocian towns, but soon ceded them to Byzantine control. (Note: Lilie argues that these inland territories held little strategic value for the crusaders.) By contrast, Baldwin of Boulogne, Godfrey's brother, and Tancred, Bohemond's nephew, established garrisons in Cilician fortresses seized during a secondary campaign. The main army began the siege of Antioch in October, but the city's defences prevented a full blockade, while winter shortages strained the besiegers. Leading a separate campaign, Baldwin founded the County of Edessa, the first Crusader state, in March 1098.

In early 1098, Tatikios withdrew to Cyprus for unclear reasons. Desertions increased as news spread of a relieving army under the Seljuk general Kerbogha, while distorted reports of the crusaders' desperate situation and a Seljuk invasion convinced Alexios to prioritise imperial defence over advancing on Antioch. Despite this, the crusaders captured Antioch on 3 June and defeated Kerbogha on 28 June. Bohemond then claimed the city, although the other leaders continued to support Alexios's claim.

While summer heat delayed the advance on Jerusalem, Bohemond assumed control of much of Antioch and granted privileges to the Genoese, although some towers were still garrisoned by the men of his principal rival, Raymond. When the crusade resumed in November, with Raymond leaving northern Syria, Bohemond consolidated his authority and, in March 1099, rebuffed Byzantine envoys demanding the city's surrender. The crusaders continued south and captured Jerusalem on 15 July. Godfrey became its first Western ruler, and in 1100 his brother and successor Baldwin was crowned the first King of Jerusalem.

== Conflicts and cooperation ==
=== Rival claims ===
The establishment of the Crusader states transformed the political landscape of the Middle East. Antioch was especially significant, since its strategic position rendered any Byzantine campaign against Jerusalem or Edessa impracticable. The new states also intensified commercial ties between Byzantium and Western Europe. In 1099–1100, Catholic clerics were appointed to the sees of Jerusalem and Antioch, disregarding imperial prerogatives. In Jerusalem, this was facilitated by the death of the Orthodox patriarch Symeon II; in Antioch, Bohemond exiled Patriarch John the Oxite and installed a Catholic incumbent. The Byzantines rejected these appointments and instead named Orthodox patriarchs residing in Constantinople, creating parallel Catholic and Orthodox successions in both sees.

During the First Crusade, a Byzantine force seized the port of Laodicea, threatening Bohemond's rule in Antioch. He allied with Archbishop Daimbert of Pisa, who arrived in August 1099 with a fleet that had plundered Byzantine islands. In response, Bohemond's rival, Raymond of Toulouse, intervened and seized Laodicea with Byzantine approval. Imperial forces then secured Cilicia, and the Byzantine position was strengthened when Turkomans captured Bohemond in August 1100. The following year, Tancred became regent for Bohemond and seized Cilician towns from the Byzantines.

Another wave of crusaders reached Constantinople in spring 1101, led by nobles and prelates including Anselm of Milan, William IX of Aquitaine, and Welf of Bavaria. Alexios required their leaders to swear an oath to restore reconquered imperial territories and appointed the general Tzitas to escort them through Anatolia. They recovered Ankyra for the Byzantines before being destroyed by Turkoman coalitions. Raymond withdrew from Laodicea and, with Byzantine support, prepared campaigns against Tortosa and Tripoli south of Antioch. Tancred soon seized Laodicea from the Byzantines.

=== Bohemond's crusade ===
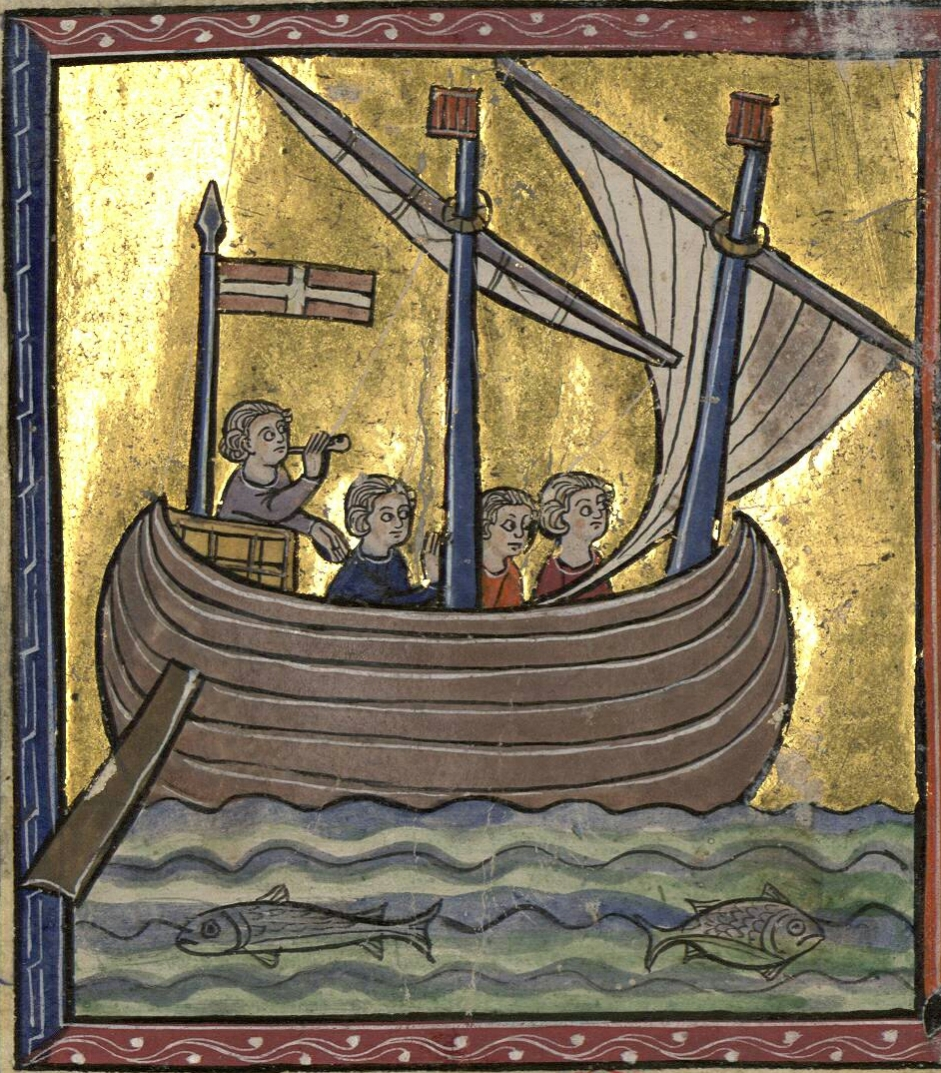
Bohemond I of Antioch's return to Italy (from a 13th-century manuscript of William of Tyre's chronicle)

After the Danishmendid Gazi Gümüshtigin released him for ransom, Bohemond again refused Alexios's demand to surrender Antioch. On 7 May 1104, a Turkoman coalition defeated forces from Antioch and Edessa at the Battle of Harran. Later that year, Byzantine forces recovered Laodicea and several Cilician towns, prompting Bohemond to return to Europe to seek Western support.

Backed by Pope Paschal II, Bohemond organised a new campaign and raised French and Italian crusaders. In autumn 1107 he attacked Dyrrachium. (Note: The available sources do not make clear whether Pope Paschal II specifically sanctioned a crusade against Byzantium or whether Bohemond redirected an expedition originally intended for the Holy Land against the empire.) Alexios recruited Turkoman mercenaries and secured Venetian naval support. The Byzantines blockaded Bohemond's army and cut its supplies, forcing him to surrender in September 1108. Under the Treaty of Devol, Bohemond became a lizios ('liege man') (Note: The precise meaning of the term remains uncertain. Lilie interprets it as an expression of a form of "feudal bond", suggesting that Bohemond became Alexios's vassal in accordance with Western custom. Harris, by contrast, regards it as a form of the traditional relationship between Byzantine emperors and defeated adversaries, who were customarily employed as mercenaries.) of Alexios and agreed to accept an Orthodox patriarch; in return, he retained Antioch for life. The treaty was never implemented: Bohemond did not return to Antioch, and Tancred ignored the agreement, expanding into Cilicia and regaining Laodicea. Alexios then encouraged Seljuk attacks on Edessa and Antioch. (Note: Amid a succession crisis, the leaders of the Seljuk Empire largely ignored the Frankish threat. Envoys sent by Alexios to the Seljuk sultan Muhammad I Tapar appear to have encouraged military action, but the intervention ultimately failed, chiefly owing to the reluctance of Syrian Muslim rulers to cooperate.)

In July 1109, a Frankish coalition captured Tripoli and granted it to Raymond of Toulouse's son, Bertrand, who had sworn fealty to Alexios. Alexios later sought support from Bertrand and Baldwin of Jerusalem against Tancred, but both refused. After Bertrand's death in 1112, his son Pons renewed the oath. Tancred died the same year and was succeeded by his nephew, Roger of Salerno.

=== Tensions ===
The Crusader states, c. 1135

Emperor Alexios died on 15 August 1118. His son and successor, John II Komnenos, initially faced conspiracies and invasions that limited Byzantine involvement in the Crusader states. The following year, Antioch nearly fell to the Turkomans after Roger of Salerno was killed at the Battle of the Field of Blood, but was saved by Baldwin II, the new king of Jerusalem, who became regent for the absent Bohemond II, Bohemond I's son.

John refused to confirm Venetian commercial privileges, which provoked a naval attack on Aegean islands during the Venetian Crusade of 1123–24; peace was restored in 1126 when he finally confirmed them. That year, Bohemond II arrived in Antioch and married Baldwin II's daughter, Alice, but Danishmendid forces killed him in 1130. Baldwin again assumed the regency, this time for Bohemond and Alice's six-year-old daughter, Constance of Antioch. His death the following year triggered a conflict between his successor and son-in-law, Fulk of Anjou, and Alice.

Meanwhile, the Turkoman general Zengi began expanding his territory in Syria. Exploiting the resulting instability, Leo, an Armenian ruler in Cilicia, seized coastal towns from Antioch. In 1136, Antiochene envoys proposed Constance's marriage to John's youngest son Manuel, but Fulk instead arranged her marriage to the French Raymond of Poitiers. By the mid-1130s, Byzantine concern over the empire's southeastern frontiers had intensified. Three 12th-century historians differ in their explanations: John Kinnamos and William of Tyre emphasise Constance's marriage, while Niketas Choniates highlights Armenian expansion.

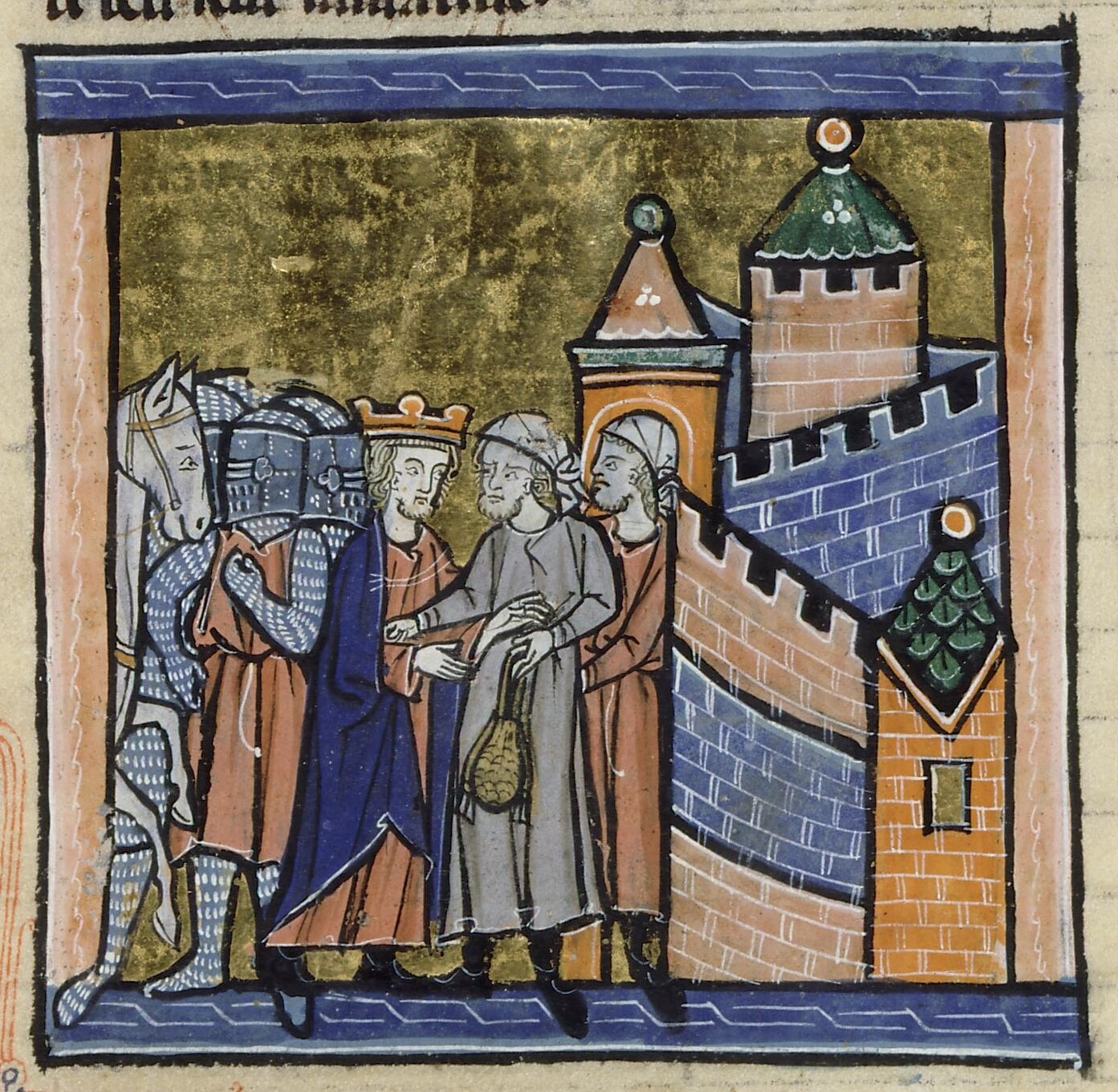
Negotiations between John II Komnenos and the emir of Shaizar during the 1138 siege of the city (from a 13th-century manuscript of William of Tyre's chronicle)

In summer 1137, John invaded Cilicia, captured coastal towns, and drove Leo into the Taurus Mountains. He then advanced on Antioch, compelling Raymond to submit in September. The exact terms remain unclear: Kinnamos and Choniates note Raymond's acceptance of Byzantine suzerainty, whereas William of Tyre records Raymond's promise to cede Antioch in exchange for Aleppo and other cities once captured with Byzantine support. In May 1138, Raymond and Joscelin II of Edessa joined John's campaign against Aleppo. When the campaign failed, the army attacked Shaizar; its ruler secured peace by paying an indemnity. John then made a triumphal entry into Antioch, where Raymond again acknowledged him as overlord. John made a new attempt to reinforce his direct control of northern Syria in autumn 1142. He attacked the Edessan stronghold of Turbessel and forced Joscelin to surrender a daughter as a hostage, then advanced on Antioch and, as Kinnamos relates, demanded the city for Manuel. Raymond refused, arguing—according to William of Tyre—that he ruled in his wife's right. John withdrew to winter in Cilicia and planned a pilgrimage to Jerusalem, which Fulk dissuaded him from undertaking.

John died in a hunting accident in April 1143. The Byzantinist Paul Magdalino observes that John's death thwarted the most ambitious Byzantine attempt to restore the pre-Islamic empire since the 10th century. Manuel succeeded John. Exploiting the uncertain succession and a Seljuk invasion, Raymond attacked Byzantine towns in Cilicia, but his incursion was repelled by imperial forces. On 24 November 1144, Zengi besieged Edessa. Raymond was unable to send relief, and Edessa fell in late December. This loss forced Raymond to reconcile with Byzantium; he visited Constantinople to swear fealty to Manuel. Meanwhile, the Cilician Armenians prospered, as Leo's son Thoros II united much of Cilicia.

=== Second Crusade ===
The fall of Edessa prompted Pope Eugenius III to proclaim the Second Crusade in December 1145. Led by Conrad III of Germany and Louis VII of France, the expedition passed through Byzantine territory, causing concern in Constantinople. Byzantine envoys first negotiated passage, but clashes in the Balkans proved unavoidable. In summer 1147, Roger II of Sicily's raid on Byzantine lands heightened fears of a coordinated Western attack.

The Germans reached Constantinople in September and crossed into Anatolia without waiting for the French. Ignoring Emperor Manuel's advice, they engaged the Sultanate of Rum and were decisively defeated at the Battle of Dorylaeum. Conrad escaped into Byzantine territory and, delayed by illness, did not resume the crusade until the following spring. The French arrived in October 1147. A faction led by Bishop Godefroy of Langres urged Louis to attack Constantinople to retaliate for the expulsion of Catholic clergy from Cilicia. According to Odo of Deuil, Manuel diverted them by spreading reports of a German victory. The French relied on plunder, prompting local Greeks to support the Turkomans, who harassed them across western Anatolia. Weakened, Louis and several leaders sailed from Attalia to Antioch aboard Byzantine ships, while the Turkomans largely destroyed those left behind en route to Syria.

After reaching Jerusalem, the remaining crusaders besieged Damascus, but the operation failed in July 1148. On his return journey to Germany, Conrad renewed his anti-Norman alliance with Manuel at Thessalonica in 1148–1149. The French, however, accused the Byzantines of poor provisioning and collaboration with the Seljuks, blaming them for the crusade's failure.

=== Byzantine hegemony ===
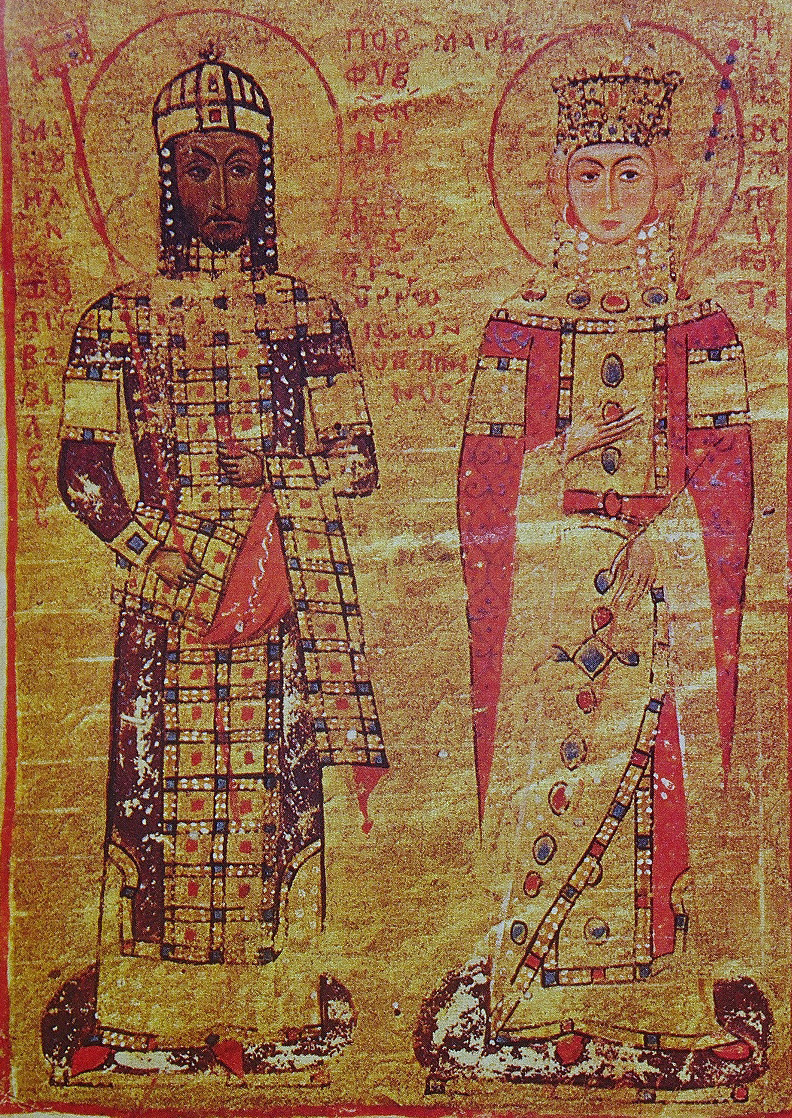
Emperor Manuel I Komnenos and his wife Maria of Antioch (from the Acts of the Council of Constantinople of 1166)

In the aftermath of the Second Crusade, Manuel faced both invasion and internal rebellions. In the east, Nur al-Din, Zengi's successor at Aleppo, raided the Crusader states. Raymond of Antioch died at the Battle of Inab in 1149, and in 1150, Nur al-Din captured Joscelin II of Edessa. His wife, Beatrice, sold the county's remaining lands to Manuel, but within a year Nur al-Din had taken them. Seeking to strengthen Byzantine influence at Antioch, Manuel proposed that Princess Constance marry his former brother-in-law, the Kaisar John Roger; instead, she married the French knight Raynald of Châtillon in 1153. Raynald campaigned against Thoros II of Cilicia in Byzantine service but, judging his reward delayed, allied with Thoros and raided Cyprus.

In 1158, Manuel made peace with William I of Sicily, enabling a firmer policy towards the Crusader states, increasingly threatened by Nur al-Din's union of Damascus and Aleppo. Western crusading zeal had waned, and reinforcements to Syria were insufficient. In 1157, Baldwin III of Jerusalem sent envoys to Constantinople proposing a marriage alliance; Manuel chose his niece Theodora as Baldwin's bride and granted a dowry of 100,000 nomismata.

When Manuel launched a punitive campaign against Cilicia and Antioch, Baldwin supported him. In early 1159, Manuel compelled Raynald to swear fealty to him and accept the replacement of Antioch's Latin patriarch with an Orthodox prelate. Present at the negotiations, Baldwin helped reconcile Manuel and Thoros, who acknowledged Byzantine suzerainty. Manuel's ceremonial entry into Antioch symbolized imperial supremacy: Baldwin rode behind him without royal insignia, while Raynald acted as marshal. Manuel also pledged support against Aleppo, but the projected joint campaign was abandoned after he made peace with Nur al-Din in exchange for an alliance against the Seljuks of Rum. Raynald ultimately failed to install an Orthodox patriarch.

In 1160–1161, Turkomans captured Raynald, and Baldwin III appointed Aimery, the Latin Patriarch of Antioch, regent for Constance's young son, Bohemond III. Widowed in 1159, Manuel sought a Frankish bride; although Baldwin proposed Melisende of Tripoli, Manuel chose Constance's daughter, Maria. Offended by Melisende's rejection, her brother, Raymond III of Tripoli, raided Byzantine territory with his fleet. After Baldwin's death in 1163, his brother Amalric succeeded him and warned Louis VII of France that, without Western aid, the Crusader states would fall either to Nur al-Din or to Byzantium.

=== Designs on Egypt ===
In Lilie's view, Manuel's 1159 intervention convinced the Franks that he would not undermine Nur ad-Din, while signalling to Nur ad-Din that Byzantium would prevent any territorial expansion at Antioch's expense; both sides consequently turned to the weakening Fatimid Caliphate. Amalric of Jerusalem invaded Egypt in September 1163, which prompted Nur ad-Din to send the general Shirkuh the following year. Nur ad-Din also invaded Antiochene territory, defeating a Byzantine–Antiochene–Cilician Armenian coalition at the Battle of Harim. Manuel ransomed Bohemond III of Antioch, who had been captured in the battle, in return for the installation of the Orthodox patriarch Athanasius I in Antioch.

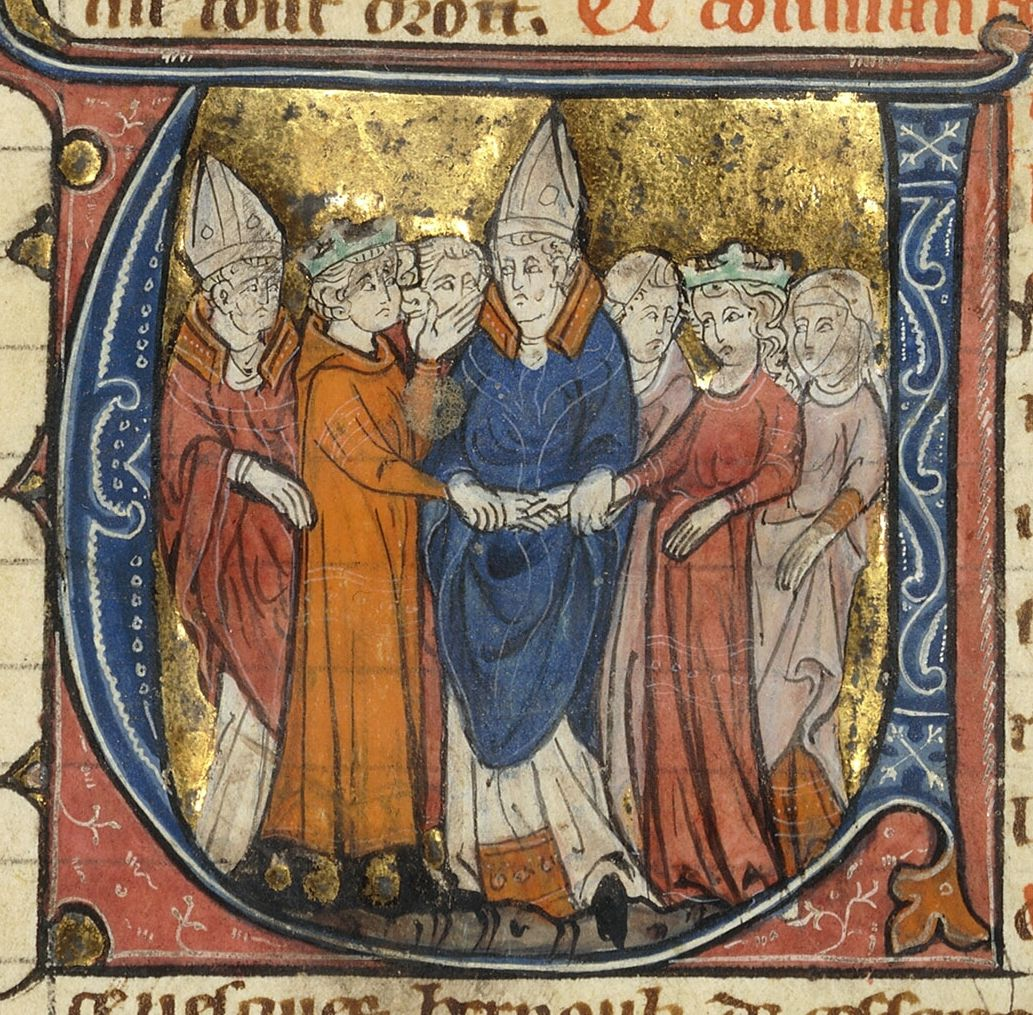
Marriage of Amalric I of Jerusalem and Maria Komnena (from a 13th-century manuscript of William of Tyre's chronicle)

Concluding that the Crusader states depended on Byzantine protection, Amalric sent an embassy to Constantinople in 1165 to seek an imperial bride. At the same time, Manuel's cousin Andronikos Komnenos embezzled imperial funds and fled to Jerusalem, where Amalric, unaware of his earlier conduct, granted him the Lordship of Beirut. In 1167, Amalric married Manuel's great-niece Maria Komnena and swore fealty to him. With Byzantine support, churches and monasteries were restored throughout the kingdom. (Note: These restorations provided a means of presenting Manuel as the true successor of Constantine the Great, notably in mosaic panels depicting him in representations of church unity.) Manuel also demanded Andronikos's extradition, but he and his lover Theodora, Manuel's widowed niece, fled to Nur ad-Din.

Fearing invasion, the Fatimid caliph al-Adid appointed Shirkuh vizier in early 1169, and after his death, appointed Shirkuh's nephew Saladin. In late summer a Byzantine fleet of more than 150 galleys reached Cyprus for a joint assault on the Egyptian port of Damietta, but delays by the Jerusalemite army caused the invasion to fail. Lilie suggests that Amalric acted half-heartedly, opposing Byzantine expansion. In 1170, an earthquake destroyed Antioch Cathedral and killed Patriarch Athanasius, prompting Bohemond to restore the Latin patriarch. After a Jerusalemite embassy failed to obtain Western aid, Amalric travelled to Constantinople in 1171 and, according to Kinnamos, swore fealty to Manuel.

After al-Adid's death in September 1171, Saladin abolished the Fatimid Caliphate, although his relations with Nur ad-Din deteriorated. Nur ad-Din died in May 1174, leaving an underage son, al-Salih. Amalric died two months later, and Jerusalem passed to his leprous son Baldwin IV. By year's end, Saladin had secured Damascus, Homs, and Hama. Renewed war with the Seljuks of Rum culminated in Manuel's defeat at the Battle of Myriocephalum, though it did not undermine Byzantine power. (Note: Some Byzantinists, notably Lilie, have characterized Manuel's campaign as a "Byzantine Crusade", although the term has not gained wide acceptance. Prior to the expedition, Manuel informed Pope Alexander III of his intention to invade Seljuk territory in order to secure the route to the Holy Land, prompting the pope to call for a crusade.) In August 1177, despite plans for a joint Egyptian campaign, the Jerusalemite council rejected the proposal after a Byzantine fleet reached Acre; no further action followed, although negotiations continued until Manuel's death on 24 September 1180.

Dynastic marriages between Byzantium and the Crusader states

John II Komnenos; *1087 †1143; Byzantine emperor (r. 1118–1143) ∞ Irene of Hungary †1134
Andronikos Komnenos *c. 1108 †1142 sebastokrator	Isaac Komnenos *c. 1112 sebastokrator	Manuel I Komnenos; *1118 †1180; Byzantine emperor (r. 1143–1180) ∞(1) Irene (Bertha) of Sulzbach †1159/60 ∞(2) Maria of Antioch †1182
John Komnenos protovestiarios	Theodora Komnene ∞ Baldwin III; *1130 †1163; King of Jerusalem r. 1143–1163
Maria Komnene ∞ Amalric; *1136 †1174; King of Jerusalem r. 1163–1174	Theodora Komnene (?) ∞ Bohemond III *c. 1148 †1201; Prince of Antioch r. 1163–1201

=== Rift ===
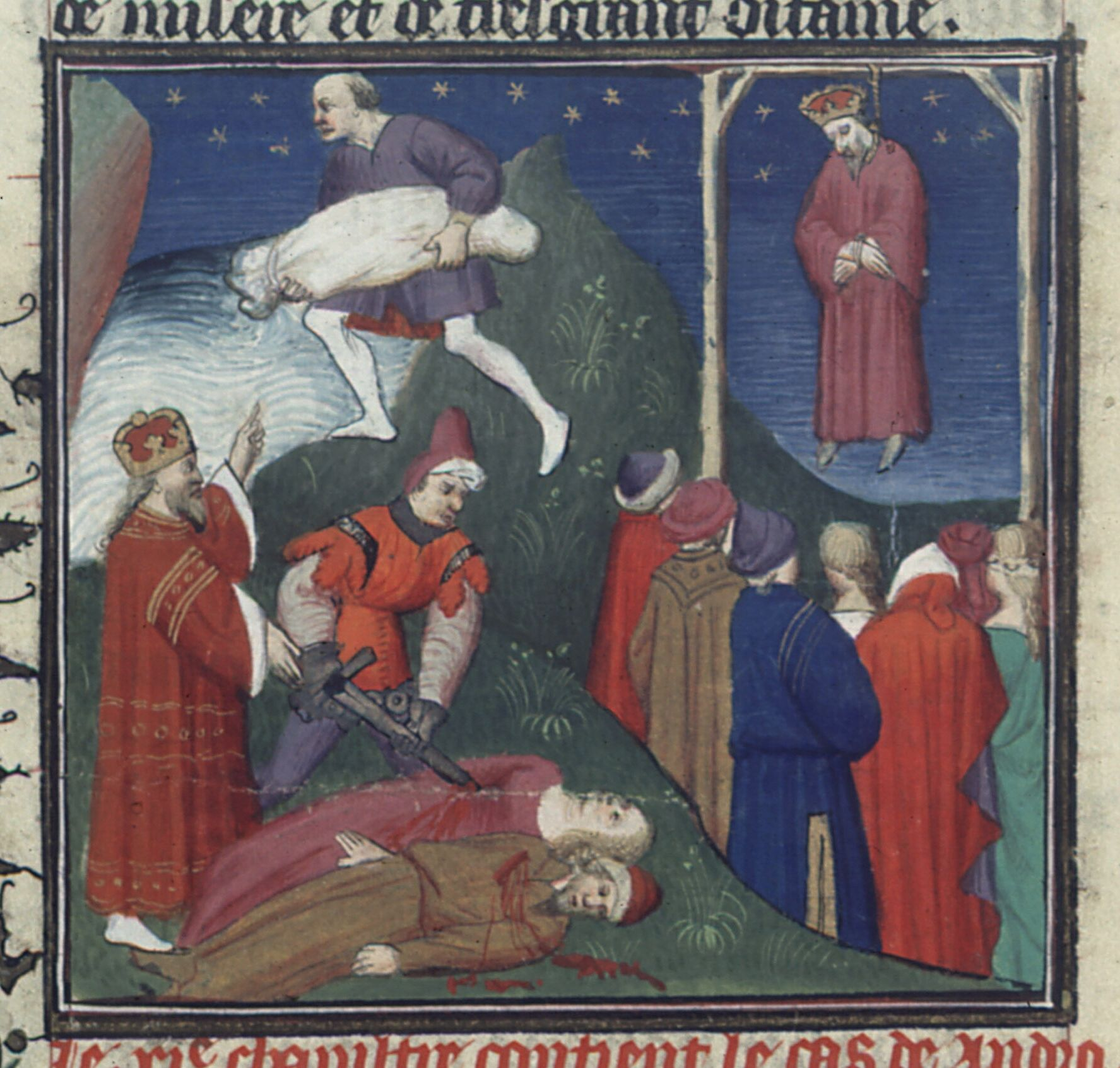
Emperor Andronikos I Komnenos seizing power and his lynching by a mob (from an early-15th-century manuscript of Giovanni Boccaccio's On the Fates of Famous Men)

Emperor Manuel was succeeded by his eleven-year-old son, Alexios II Komnenos, who ruled under the regency of his mother, Maria of Antioch. Her authority was soon challenged, and Bohemond III of Antioch repudiated his Byzantine wife. In April 1182, Andronikos Komnenos seized power in a coup amid popular unrest, during which a mob rampaged through Constantinople's Italian quarter, massacring those who failed to escape. The atrocity aroused strong anti-Byzantine feeling in Western Europe and the Crusader states. The atrocity aroused strong anti-Byzantine feeling in Western Europe and the Crusader states. Andronikos purged his opponents and executed Alexios. In early 1185, Manuel's grandnephew Isaac Komnenos seized Cyprus and assumed the imperial title, and in June, William II of Sicily invaded from the west.

A letter by an anonymous Western writer, preserved in Magnus of Reichersberg's chronicle, states that William's invasion led Andronikos to ally with Saladin against the Seljuks of Rum and the Crusader states. Since no other source confirms this, its reliability is doubtful. Harris suggests that it may instead reflect Saladin's promise, if he captured Jerusalem, to recognise Andronikos as protector of the holy places and local Christians. Nevertheless, as Magdalino notes, under Andronikos and his successors Byzantium "opted out of the crusading movement". William's capture of Thessalonica in August 1185 prompted another purge in Constantinople. Isaac Angelos, an intended victim, rebelled with popular support; Andronikos was lynched and Isaac proclaimed emperor. The army soon recovered Thessalonica and massacred many Normans. Later in 1185, Isaac's attempt to impose an extraordinary levy provoked a revolt among the Bulgarians and Vlachs in the Balkans.

=== Third Crusade ===
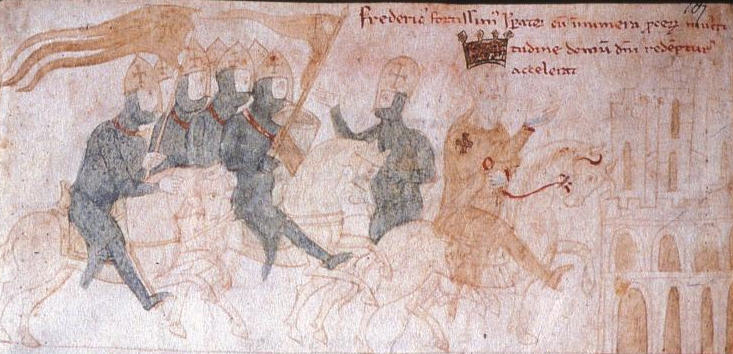
Emperor Frederick I on the Third Crusade (from a late 12th-century manuscript of Liber ad honorem Augusti by Peter of Eboli)

On 4 July 1187, Saladin destroyed the army of the Kingdom of Jerusalem at the Battle of Hattin. Magnus of Reichersberg's correspondent alleged that Isaac II had encouraged Saladin to attack the Franks, although Harris rejects this as "demonstrably false". By the year's end, Saladin held Jerusalem and most of the kingdom. As anti-Byzantine feeling grew, rumours in Catholic Europe alleged an alliance between Saladin and Isaac, whereas Muslim and Eastern Christian sources mention only negotiations over transferring the Church of the Holy Sepulchre to the Orthodox Patriarch of Jerusalem.

After news of Hattin reached Rome in October 1187, Pope Gregory VIII proclaimed the Third Crusade. Emperor Frederick I, Richard I of England, and Philip II of France took the cross. Planning to travel overland, Frederick negotiated with anti-Byzantine leaders such as Stefan Nemanja of Serbia, which prompted Isaac to send an embassy to him. An agreement concluded in 1188 granted the Germans safe passage and market access, while Frederick pledged peaceful transit.

When the German crusaders entered Byzantine territory in July 1189, supplies proved inadequate and a Byzantine embassy accused Frederick of intending to place his son, Frederick of Swabia, on the imperial throne in Constantinople. Frederick seized Philippopolis, while his son defeated a nearby Byzantine force. The crisis intensified western suspicions of Isaac's alliance with Saladin, and rumours spread that the Byzantines were poisoning the crusaders. Frederick even considered attacking Constantinople. Although Isaac informed Saladin of the crusaders' arrival, Harris argues that this reflected conventional diplomacy rather than obstruction. A settlement followed, and in March 1190 the Germans crossed into Anatolia. They captured Konya, capital of Rum, but Frederick drowned in the River Saleph on 10 June.

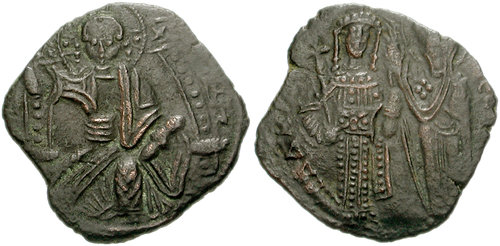
A tetarteron of Isaac Komnenos, self-declared Byzantine emperor of Cyprus

The French and English crusaders sailed from Sicily in spring 1191. Scattered by a storm, the English fleet regrouped at Cyprus, which Richard swiftly seized. He imprisoned the self-styled emperor Isaac Komnenos and sold the island to the Knights Templar, who returned it after a local revolt; Richard then sold it to Guy of Lusignan, the former King of Jerusalem. Cyprus, the first Byzantine territory permanently taken by crusaders, remained under Lusignan rule for centuries. The Third Crusade restored parts of the Crusader states, notably through the recapture of Acre and Richard's victory at Arsuf.

Frederick I was succeeded by his son Henry VI, who in 1194 conquered Sicily, which his wife Constance claimed. Meanwhile, Bulgarian and Vlach rebels, aided by Cumans, secured the Balkan Mountains and revived the Bulgarian Empire. Isaac, having lost support, was deposed by his brother Alexios III Angelos in April 1195. Alexios maintained what Lilie calls "empty claims" by granting the Venetians privileges in Antioch and Laodicea.

Henry took the cross that year and demanded access to Byzantine ports, ships, and 5,000 pounds of gold, threatening invasion. Alexios agreed to pay 1,000 pounds and imposed the Alamanikon ('German tax'). Byzantium was spared by Henry's sudden death and the ensuing civil war.

== Crusaders against Byzantium ==
=== Fourth Crusade ===
Pope Innocent III proclaimed the Fourth Crusade against the Ayyubids—Saladin's kin and successors—in 1198. French nobles, notably Theobald III of Champagne and Baldwin IX of Flanders, welcomed his appeal. In February 1199, Alexios III wrote to the Pope, expressing hope for Jerusalem's recovery without promising participation. In turn, Innocent urged him to assist the expedition and to end the schism by accepting papal supremacy.

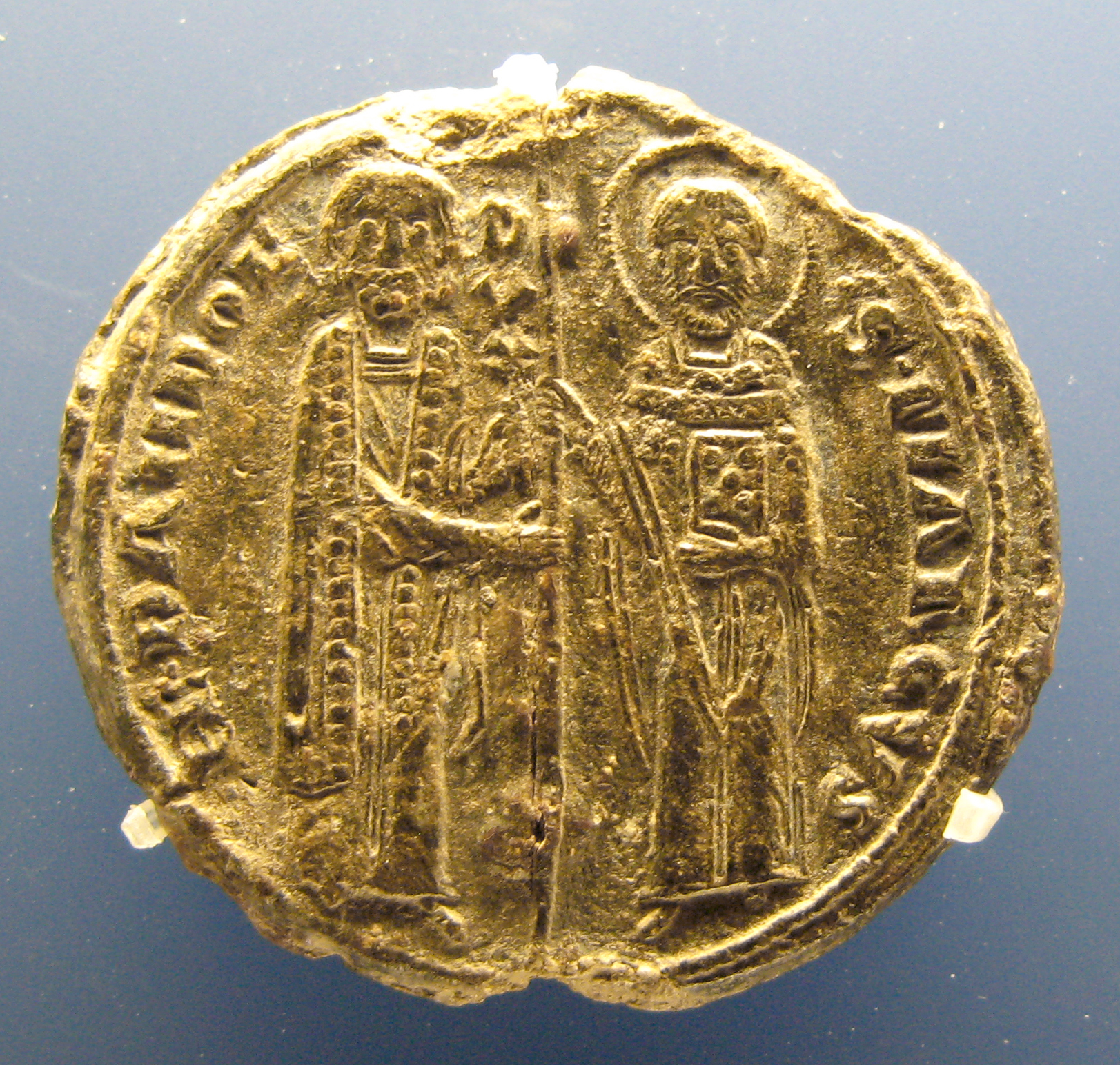
The seal of Enrico Dandolo, Doge of Venice during the Fourth Crusade

In April 1201, the crusade leaders concluded a treaty with Venice, agreeing to pay 85,000 marks by April 1202 for ships to carry more than 33,000 crusaders and their provisions. That summer they chose Boniface I of Montferrat to lead the expedition. (Note: Boniface's brother Renier of Montferrat had married Manuel I Komnenos's daughter Maria in 1180, but they both perished in the purge under Andronikos I.) When the crusaders could not pay in full, Venice deferred 35,000 marks in return for help capturing Zara, a town in Dalmatia under Hungarian rule. Meanwhile Alexios Angelos, son of the deposed Emperor Isaac II, fled Constantinople to seek Western aid against Alexios III. In January 1203, he offered to submit the Byzantine church to Rome, pay 200,000 marks, and join the crusade with 10,000 troops if his father were restored.

Despite opposition from the rank and file, the principal leaders—Boniface, Baldwin, and the Venetian doge Enrico Dandolo—accepted Alexios's offer, (Note: In a letter to Pope Innocent in August 1203, Boniface argued that the crusade had to be diverted to Constantinople to secure funds for continuing the campaign for the Holy Land. However, early 13th-century papal documents imply that Boniface's desire for vengeance for the murder of his brother, Renier, alongside his territorial ambitions, influenced this decision.) and the fleet reached Constantinople on 24 June 1203. Although Innocent forbade an attack on the city, his envoys failed to reach the crusaders. (Note: Previously, in November 1202, Pope Innocent had cautioned Emperor Alexios III that "the fire in distant regions" might spread to Byzantine territory if he withheld support for the crusaders.) The imperial army, numbering nearly 20,000, was roughly equal in strength to the crusaders, but Alexios III fled after the Venetians seized towers along the Golden Horn. Isaac II was restored, and on 1 August, his son was crowned co-emperor as Alexios IV. He paid 100,000 marks and, in a joint letter with Patriarch John X of Constantinople, reaffirmed papal primacy.

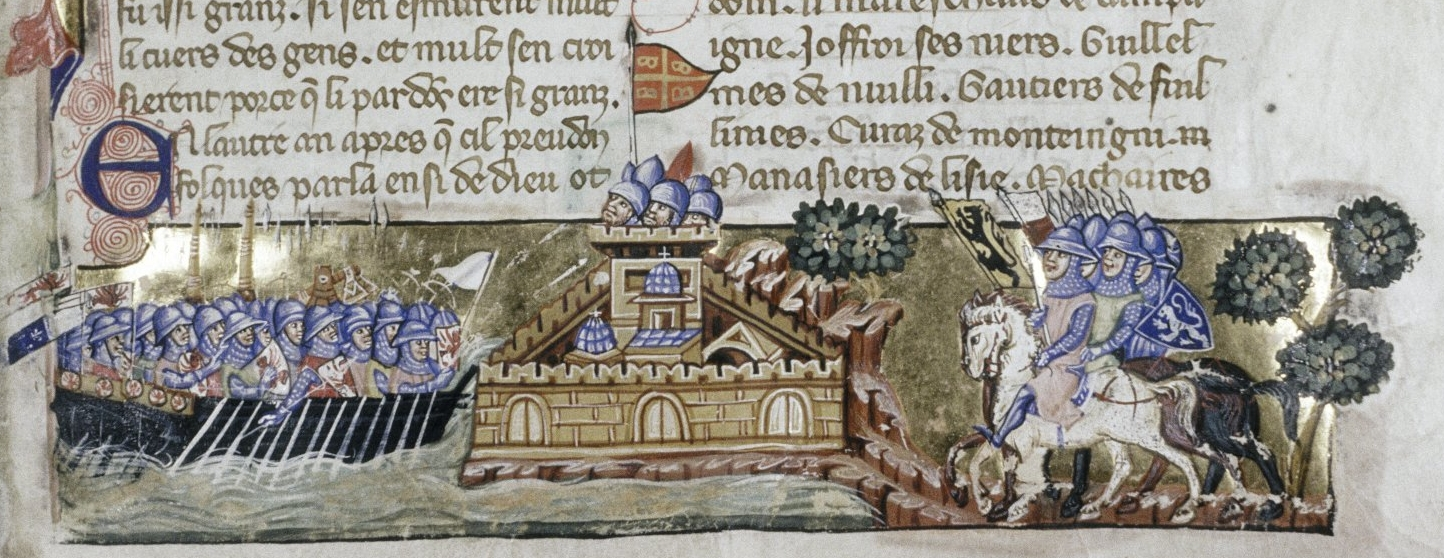
The second attack on Constantinople during the Fourth Crusade (from a 14th-century manuscript of De la Conquête de Constantinople by Geoffrey of Villehardouin)

Alexios IV failed to pay the remaining 100,000 marks, as wartime destruction in Constantinople and Alexios III's continued resistance beyond the capital reduced tax revenues. The resulting taxation, together with tensions with the crusaders, provoked widespread unrest. On 29 January 1204, the aristocrat Alexios Doukas Mourtzouphlos seized power as Alexios V, but the crusaders denounced him as a usurper. During a skirmish, they captured an icon of the Mother of God, which they interpreted as a sign of divine favour. In March 1204, as they prepared to renew the siege, the crusader leaders and the Venetians agreed to elect a Latin emperor, who would receive a quarter of the city and empire. Venice was to take another quarter of the city and three-eighths of the empire, with the remainder divided into fiefs. If a crusader became emperor, a Venetian would be patriarch, and conversely.

After a failed assault and the expulsion of prostitutes from their camp, a second attack on 12 April succeeded, and Alexios V fled. A three-day sack followed: thousands were killed, women raped, and churches desecrated. The plunder, worth 800,000 marks—equivalent to the ten-year income of what Tyerman calls "a substantial western state"—was immense. To the crusaders, victory signified divine favour against a schismatic foe, while control of the Byzantine Empire promised to strengthen the Crusader states. Pope Innocent echoed this confidence, declaring that through their conquest "the Holy Land might be more easily liberated from pagan hands".

=== Byzantine successor states ===
==== Latin consolidation ====
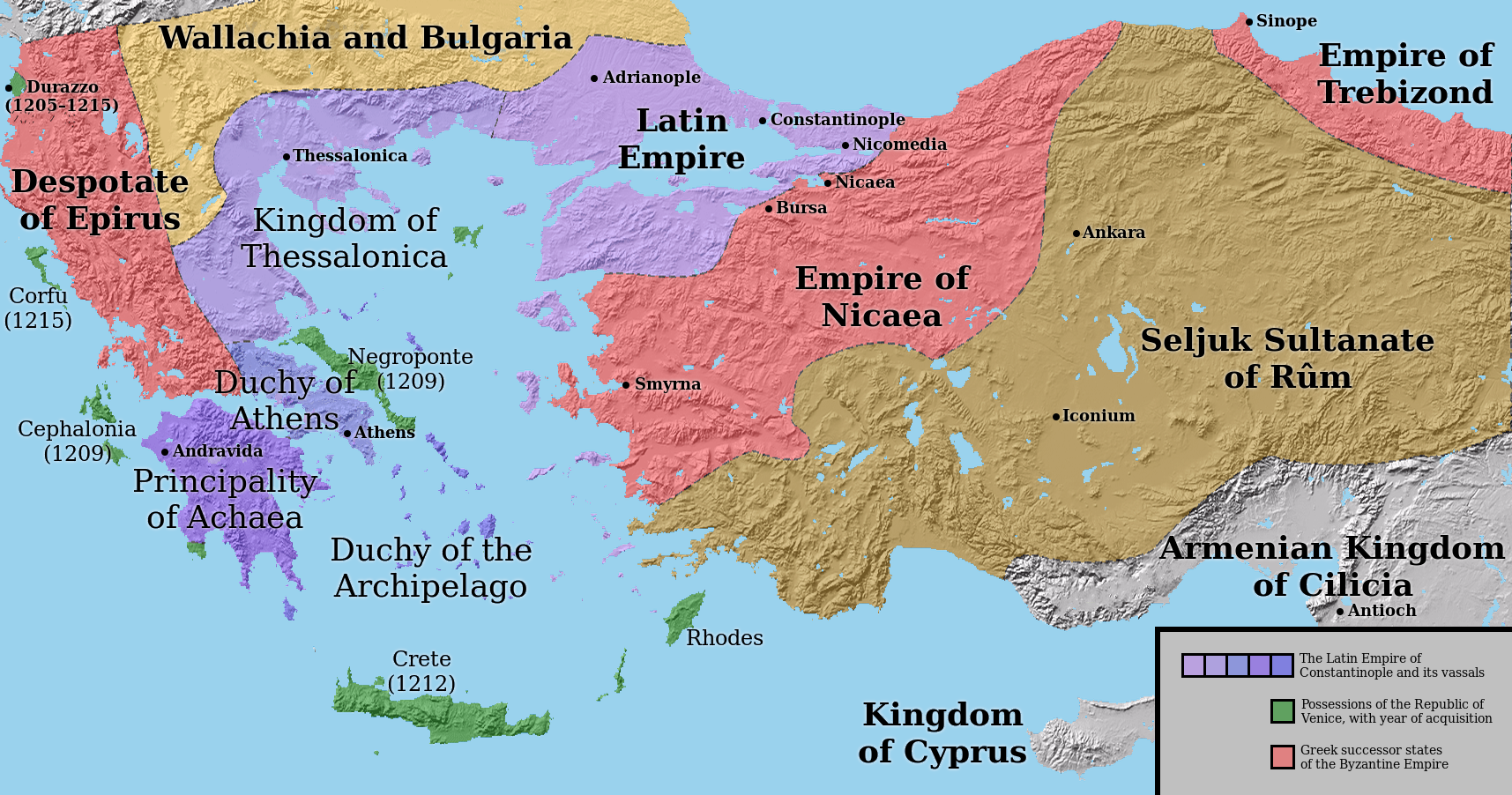
A map of the Latin Empire of Constantinople and the Byzantine successor states in the early 13th century

Boniface of Montferrat married Margaret of Hungary, widow of Emperor Isaac II, to strengthen his ties to the former Byzantine imperial dynasty. Venetian opposition to the pro-Genoese Boniface, however, secured the election of Baldwin of Flanders, crowned first Latin Emperor of Constantinople on 16 May 1204. The Venetians then installed Thomas Morosini as Latin Patriarch.

After formalising the partition of the Byzantine Empire, the Latins seized extensive territories and founded states including the Kingdom of Thessalonica, the Principality of Achaea, and the Duchy of Athens. The Latin Empire became, in the historian David Jacoby's phrase, "a mosaic of political entities", linked by shifting networks of vassalage. The Venetians took Crete, several Ionian islands, and Dalmatian ports, excluding Genoese and Pisan rivals from imperial trade.

Initially, the Latins encountered little resistance, and many locals welcomed them as protectors against enemies such as the Bulgarians. Meanwhile, the Byzantine elite, associated with heavy taxation, was widely blamed for the empire's collapse. Although Catholic bishops replaced Orthodox prelates in Latin-held dioceses, parish life changed little.

In 1205, the Bulgarian victory at the Battle of Adrianople and the capture of Baldwin exposed the fragility of Latin rule and enabled three Byzantine successor states to consolidate. The Empire of Trebizond was founded in early 1204 on the Black Sea coast of Anatolia by Alexios I and David Komnenos, grandsons of Emperor Andronikos I. It soon clashed with the Empire of Nicaea, established in western Anatolia by Theodore I Laskaris, son-in-law of Alexios III. The Despotate of Epirus was founded by Michael I Komnenos Doukas, a relative of the Angelos emperors. The Latin Empire, however, was preserved by Baldwin’s brother and successor, Henry, who extended its frontiers through campaigns against the Bulgarians and Nicaea.

==== Crusading against the Greeks ====
After the Orthodox patriarch John X died in exile in 1206, Constantinople's Orthodox clergy sought Pope Innocent III's approval to elect a successor, but Latin opposition prevented it. Theodore I of Nicaea eventually secured the election of Michael IV in 1208, and the new patriarch soon crowned him emperor. Thereafter, the Nicaean rulers claimed to be the Roman emperors' lawful successors, yet their court developed a new identity that emphasised Greek ancestry. This identity found expression in rhetoric that replaced "Romans" with "Hellenes" and asserted cultural superiority over the Latins. In 1209, Patriarch Michael urged Nicaean soldiers to fight their "unjust and arrogant enemies" and promised absolution to those who died, a stance in clear tension with traditional Byzantine theology.

The Latin Empire depended heavily on Western assistance, particularly papal support. In a letter of 7 November 1204, Innocent III already refers to "lay crusaders" serving in the Latin army in hope of receiving the spiritual rewards he had granted. Rivalries among Ayyubid rulers strengthened the Crusader states, allowing crusading energies to be directed against other enemies of Latin Christendom. Innocent proclaimed the first crusade in support of the Latins after the 1205 Battle of Adrianople, warning that a Byzantine restoration would threaten Western access to the Holy Land. He also released participants from prior pilgrimage vows, except those to the Holy Land, thereby establishing a precedent for commuting vows. Theodore Komnenos Doukas, Michael of Epirus's brother and successor, defeated the expedition near Dyrrachium in 1207.

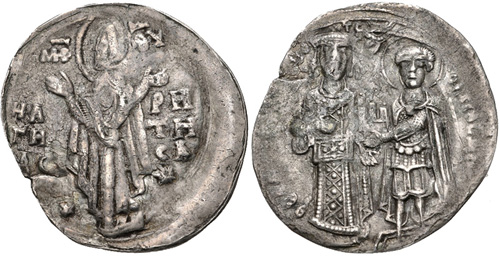
A Trachy issued c. 1227 for Theodore Komnenos Doukas, Emperor of Thessalonica

Epirus assumed leadership of the anti-Latin resistance when Theodore defeated a new crusading force led by Emperor Henry's successor, Peter of Courtenay, in 1217. After seizing Thessalonica in 1224, Theodore was crowned emperor by Archbishop Demetrios of Ochrid in order to press his claim to Constantinople. His expansion ended in 1230, when the Bulgarian tsar Ivan Asen II defeated him at the Battle of Klokotnitsa.

Meanwhile, the Nicaean emperor John III Vatatzes regained much of north-western Anatolia from the Latins; allied with the Bulgarians, he reduced the Latin Empire by 1235 to little beyond Constantinople in Thrace. Elected in 1227, Pope Gregory IX sought to redirect crusading zeal to defend the Latin Empire, urging English, French, and Hungarian crusaders bound for the Holy Land to instead fight Greeks and Bulgarians in the Aegean, and he supported John of Brienne—co-ruler for the underage Latin emperor Baldwin II—in raising troops for Constantinople's defence. Yet such efforts proved unpopular amid growing antipathy towards papal attempts to redirect crusading zeal against Christian enemies. At a meeting in 1239, English crusaders explicitly refused to shed Christian blood in Italy or Greece rather than crusade in the Holy Land.

From 1239 onwards, the papacy urged the Latin Empire's vassals, including Geoffrey II of Achaea, to assume responsibility for Constantinople's defence, funding it through taxes on clerical revenues. The diminished Latin Empire verged on bankruptcy from the 1230s. Baldwin melted down the city's treasures, then ancient bronze statues, and finally the lead roofs of the palaces. Selling or pawning relics also became an important source of income: the Crown of Thorns was first pledged to the Venetians and later sold to Louis IX of France, who built the Sainte-Chapelle in Paris to house it.

==== Rise of Nicaea ====
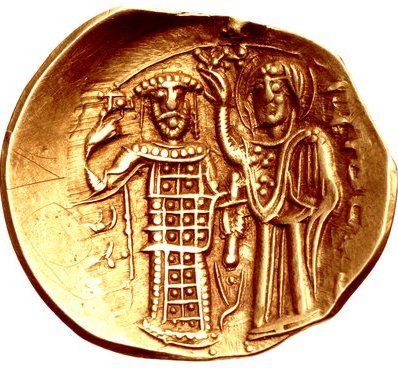
A Hyperpyron issued for John III Vatatzes, Emperor of Nicaea

In 1242, the Mongols invaded Bulgaria and the Sultanate of Rum, swiftly reducing both to tributary states. Exploiting the weakening of Nicaea's rivals, John III Vatatzes pursued expansion, and he captured several Macedonian towns and Thessalonica in 1246. Nicaea thus controlled as much territory in Europe as in Anatolia, effectively encircling Constantinople. Hoping to recover the city peacefully from the Latins, Vatatzes entered negotiations with Pope Innocent IV on a union of the churches. Although they reached compromises, the talks ended with the deaths of both men in 1254.

Vatatzes was succeeded by his epileptic son Theodore II Lascaris, whose death in 1258 left Nicaea to his seven-year-old son, John IV Lascaris. The aristocrat Michael Palaiologus seized the regency and proclaimed himself co-emperor as Michael VIII in early 1259. Nicaea's enemies sought to exploit the succession crisis, but its army defeated a coalition of Epirote, Achaean, and Sicilian forces at the Battle of Pelagonia. Eventually, the Nicaean general Alexios Strategopoulos took Constantinople by surprise, entering the city on 25 July 1261 during the absence of much of the Latin garrison and Venetian fleet. Baldwin II fled aboard a Venetian vessel.

=== Attempts at Latin restoration ===
==== First clashes ====
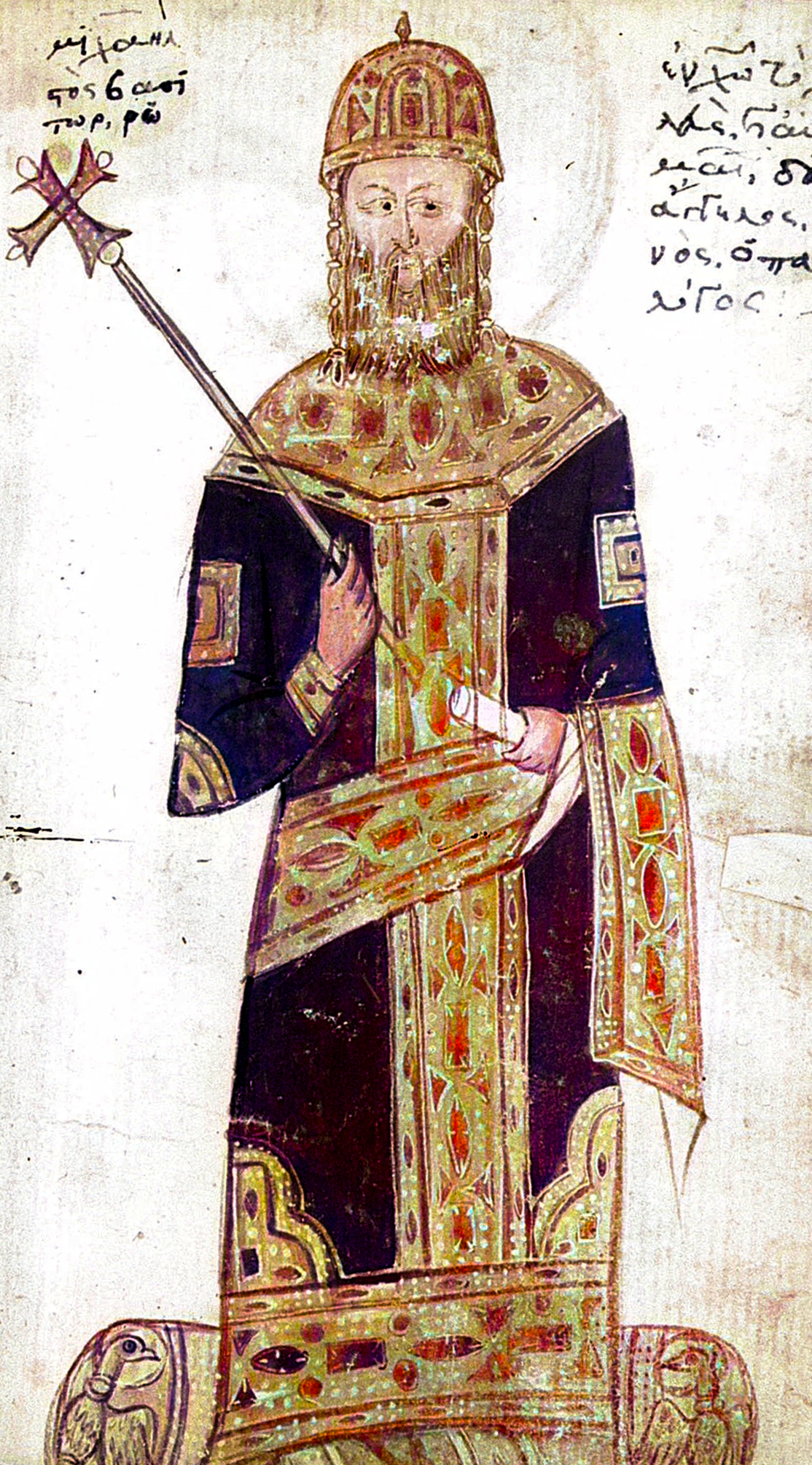
Michael VIII Palaiologos (from a 14th-century manuscript of the Historia by George Pachymeres)

Michael VIII Palaiologos was crowned emperor on 15 August 1261. He made an agreement with William II of Achaea—captured at Pelagonia—who secured his release by ceding three Peloponnesian fortresses (Note: Initially, Michael VIII demanded the whole of Achaea; however, William II refused, maintaining he was not entitled to dispose of the principality without his vassals' consent. He ultimately agreed to cede Mistra (a fortress he constructed in 1249), Monemvasia (the last Byzantine stronghold in the Peloponnese, which he occupied in 1248), and Grand Magne (a fortress situated at the south-eastern extremity of the peninsula). The agreement was sanctioned at the Parliament of Dames, attended by the wives of the Achaean lords taken captive at Pelagonia.) to the Byzantines. The child emperor John IV was deposed and blinded on Michael's orders, which led Patriarch Arsenius of Constantinople to excommunicate him.

Following the Greek recovery of Constantinople, Pope Urban IV proclaimed a crusade against the restored Byzantine Empire, although it won little support, and French and Spanish clergy refused to fund it. To promote an alliance with Venice and the exiled Latin emperor Baldwin II, the pope released William from his oath to Michael. Yet the Byzantines, aided by Genoa, seized Aegean islands and the three fortresses. The conflict drained the treasury, prompting Michael to seek reconciliation with Venice in 1265. To strengthen his position, Michael pursued what Harris terms "versatile diplomacy", forging treaties with rival powers such as the Mamluks, who had supplanted the Ayyubids as the dominant Muslim power in the Middle East, and their rivals, the Mongols of the Ilkhanate.

==== Charles of Anjou and the church union ====
Michael VIII soon faced a new adversary when Charles I of Anjou, brother of Louis IX of France, conquered Sicily with papal support in 1266. Two years later Charles concluded the Treaty of Viterbo with William II of Achaea, who swore fealty and recognized Charles and his descendants as his heirs. In return for Charles's promise to recover Constantinople, the exiled emperor Baldwin II reaffirmed the agreement and transferred his suzerainty over Frankish Greece—much of what remained of his empire—to Charles.

Michael resumed negotiations with the papacy on ecclesiastical union, and Charles soon concluded a truce with Byzantium at papal instruction. At the Second Council of Lyon in 1274, Michael's envoys accepted papal supremacy and key Catholic doctrines, and pledged support for a new crusade. Upon their return, Michael appointed the unionist John Bekkos as patriarch. The church union proved deeply unpopular, as hostility towards Westerners persisted and opposition arose even within Michael's family. (Note: Michael's sister Eulogia openly declared, "Better that my brother's empire should perish, than the purity of the Orthodox faith". She was subsequently imprisoned, but later escaped to Bulgaria.) His failure to enforce the union angered the papacy, and in 1281 Pope Martin IV excommunicated him and authorized Charles to launch an anti-Byzantine crusade. Michael responded by encouraging opposition to Charles and Venice, contributing to the War of the Sicilian Vespers between the Angevins and Aragon, which ended Charles's ambitions. After Michael's death in December 1282, his son and successor, Andronikos II Palaiologos, repudiated the union.

==== End of anti-Byzantine crusading ====
The War of the Sicilian Vespers hindered further crusades to the Holy Land, enabling the Mamluks to complete the conquest of the Crusader states by 1291, which attracted little Byzantine concern. Western crusade theorists, however, continued to address Byzantium: Pierre Dubois advocated the conquest of Constantinople, whereas Ramon Llull favoured peaceful cooperation. Both assumed that control of Constantinople was indispensable to recovering the Holy Land and envisaged a limited passagium particulare, a tax-funded mercenary force.

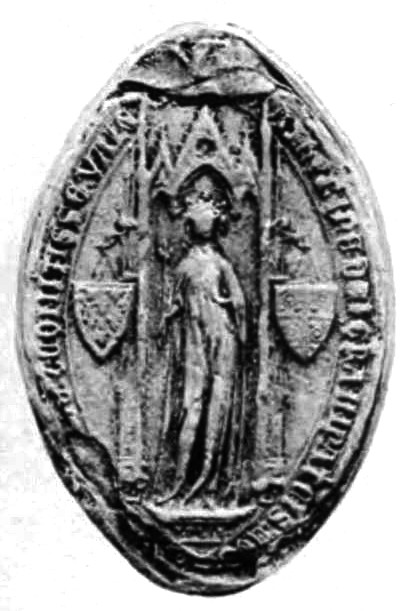
The seal of Catherine of Courtenay, titular Latin empress of Constantinople (1283–1307)

Whereas his father had concentrated on defending European territories, Andronikos II attempted to resist Turkoman advances in Anatolia, but Osman I—founder of the Ottoman state—defeated him at the Battle of Bapheus in 1302. In the West, he pursued alliances with Ghibelline (anti-papal) powers, marrying Yolande, daughter of William VII of Montferrat, as his second wife, (Note: Renamed Empress Irene in Byzantium, Yolande brought with her as dowry her father's claim to the defunct Latin Kingdom of Thessalonica. Regarding the city as her inheritance, she demanded that it be granted to her sons by Andronikos in 1303. When Andronikos refused, she settled in Thessalonica, effectively establishing an independent court.) and unsuccessfully sought a marriage between his son Michael IX and the titular Latin empress Catherine of Courtenay. She instead married Charles of Valois, brother of Philip IV of France.

In 1302, the Peace of Caltabellotta ended the War of the Sicilian Vespers and left the mercenaries of the Catalan Company unemployed. Andronikos II hired c. 6,500 Catalans to fight in Anatolia, promising 1,200,000 hyperpyra, a sum exceeding the empire's annual revenue. When payment failed, the Catalans revolted, aiding Genoese, Turkoman, and Bulgarian expansion at Byzantium's expense. Charles of Valois exploited the crisis, allying with Venice and persuading Pope Clement V to proclaim an anti-Byzantine crusade, but failed to raise sufficient funds. His plans collapsed, and Venice reconciled with Byzantium in 1310.

In 1313, Philip I of Taranto, holder of the Angevin claim to Frankish Greece, married Catherine of Valois, heir to Catherine of Courtenay. Pope Clement supported his projected campaign by granting indulgences and tax revenues, but Philip's commitments in Italy and Greece exhausted his resources, and he abandoned plans to attack Byzantium in 1320. By then, interest in recovering Constantinople had waned, and anti-Byzantine crusading effectively faded.

== Negotiations and cooperation ==
=== First attempts at cooperation ===
Andronikos II's attempt to disinherit his grandson and namesake sparked a civil war in 1321, when the younger Andronikos was proclaimed emperor. The conflict enabled Serbian and Bulgarian incursions and accelerated Ottoman expansion in Anatolia. Efforts by the elder Andronikos to secure Western aid failed amid anti-Latin sentiment, despite support from the crusade theorist Marino Sanudo Torsello. (Note: In his correspondence with Andronikos, Sanudo urged him to offer assistance for a new crusade and to reopen negotiations on church union in order to forestall Western hostility.) After his grandfather's abdication in 1328, Andronikos III became sole ruler. By then, Anatolia had fragmented into beyliks—Turkic lordships—which recruited ghazi warriors for jihad. Some, such as Aydin, developed fleets that threatened trade, prompting Venice to launch a naval league under the auspices of Pope John XXII. Although Andronikos pledged ships, he soon withdrew to preserve ties with Umur of Aydin and began paying annual tribute to the Ottoman ruler Orhan.

With Anatolia largely lost, Byzantine policy shifted westwards, focusing on Frankish Greece and Epirus. Andronikos's death in 1341, however, left his underage son, John V Palaiologos, under a contested regency, which sparked a civil war between the regent, John Kantakouzenos, and the young emperor's mother, Anna of Savoy. As Kantakouzenos allied with Umur, Anna unsuccessfully appealed to the papacy for a crusade against Aydin.

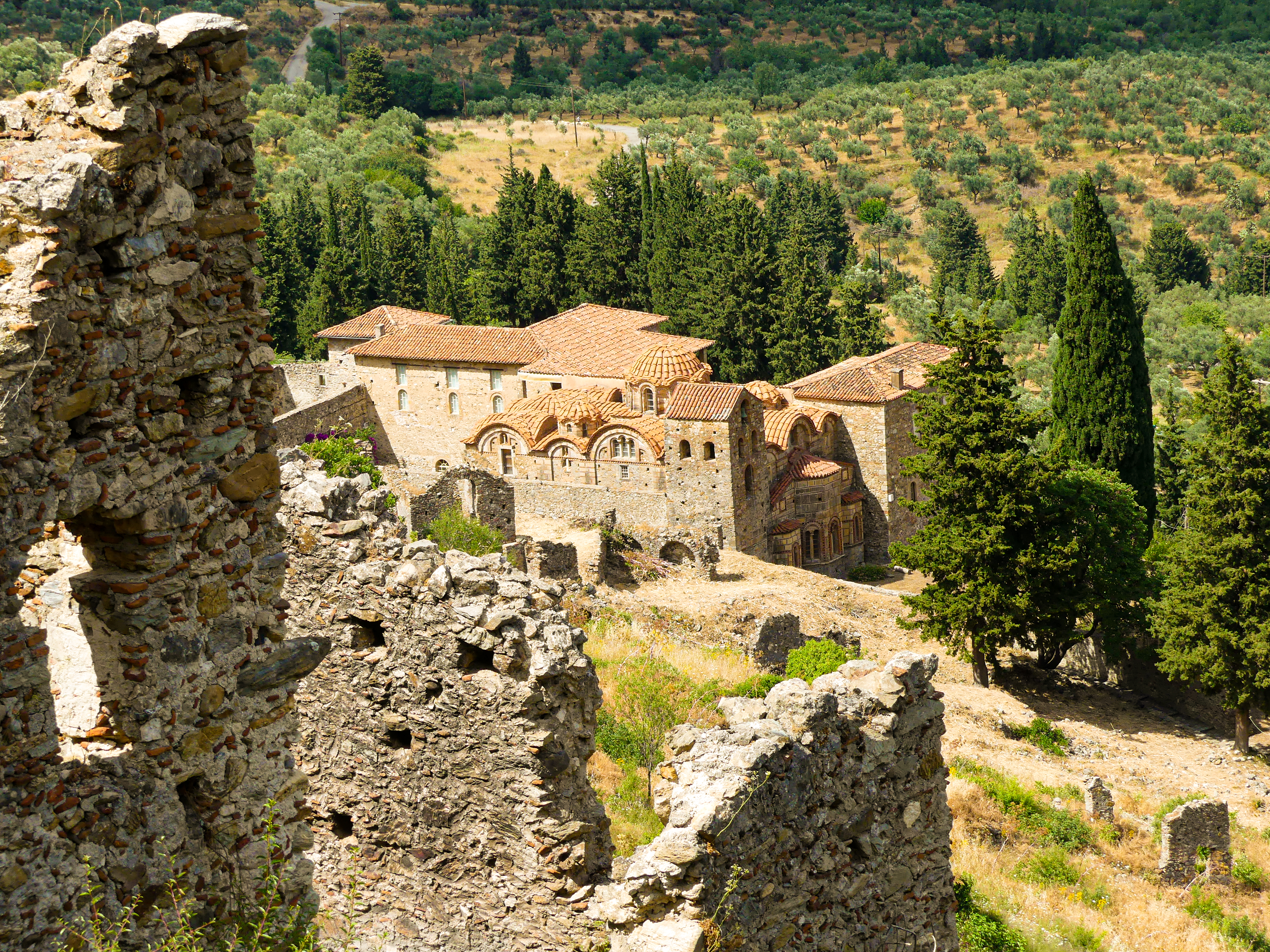
The Palace of the Despots of the Morea in Mystras

Kantakouzenos (by then John VI) distributed imperial territories among his sons, creating the autonomous Despotate of the Morea in the Peloponnese in 1349. After the Black Death further weakened the empire, he proposed joining the crusade against Aydin, despite friendly relations with Umur. In 1354, the Ottomans, who were also allied with him, secured their first European foothold at Gallipoli, precipitating his abdication and John V's full assumption of authority.

=== Anti-Ottoman crusading ===
As the ghazis crossed into the empire's western lands through Gallipoli with increasing ease, John V proposed to Pope Innocent VI a two-stage crusade, which included an initial passagium to demonstrate both the effectiveness of Western aid and the necessity of church union. The crusaders sacked the Ottoman stronghold of Lampsacus in 1357, but the campaign soon shifted to the south-eastern Mediterranean. Further appeals for action against the expanding Ottomans, made by Pope Urban V to rulers including Louis I of Hungary, failed. In 1366, John met Louis at Buda in the first state visit of a Byzantine emperor to a foreign court, but the effort failed; John was later detained by Ivan Alexander of Bulgaria. His cousin, Amadeus VI of Savoy, launched a crusade against Bulgaria to secure his release.

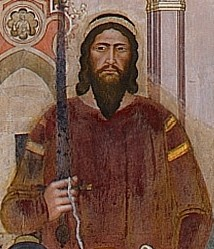
Amadeus VI of Savoy, who launched the Savoyard crusade against Bulgaria to secure the release of his cousin, John V Palaiologos (detail from a 14th-century fresco by Andrea di Bonaiuto, Spanish Chapel, Santa Maria Novella, Florence)

In 1369, the Ottomans captured Adrianople, which prompted John V to travel to Rome and submit to the papacy. Indebted to the Venetians, he was detained in Venice on his return until his debts were settled in 1371. That same year, the Ottoman victory at the Battle of Maritsa over a coalition of Serbian rulers compelled him to accept Ottoman suzerainty. Papal efforts to organise an anti-Ottoman crusade faltered amid the War of Chioggia between Genoa and Venice. In 1378, the election of two popes, Urban VI and Clement VII, began the Western Schism, with rival papal lines in Rome and Avignon.

The Ottomans captured Thessalonica in 1387 and defeated Balkan princes at the Battle of Kosovo in 1389. By 1395, Sultan Bayezid I had completed the conquest of Bulgaria and laid siege to Constantinople. His actions led both Pope Boniface IX and his Avignonese rival Benedict XIII to proclaim a crusade. An army of about 16,000 crusaders, mainly from France, Germany, and Hungary, marched towards Bulgaria but was defeated at the Battle of Nicopolis. Crusade preaching continued at Boniface IX's behest to raise funds for Constantinople's defence, while Marshal Boucicaut led French forces to the city, and Emperor Manuel II Palaiologos travelled across Europe for assistance. Constantinople was spared only after the Mongol conqueror Tamerlane defeated Bayezid at the Battle of Ankara in 1402.

The Ottoman Empire fell into civil war, from which Mehmed I—an ally of Manuel—emerged victorious in 1413. During another succession crisis following Mehmed's death, Manuel intervened against Murad II, who ultimately prevailed. Murad then renewed Ottoman expansion against Byzantium, while Manuel's son and co-emperor, John VIII Palaiologos, failed during a diplomatic tour to secure the support of Venice and Hungary. After Manuel's death, John extended Byzantine authority in the Peloponnese at the expense of local Frankish rulers, while his brother, Thomas Palaiologos, acquired the remaining territories of the Principality of Achaea.

Seeking assistance, John VIII attended the Council of Ferrara-Florence, convoked by Pope Eugene IV. Negotiations culminated in a 1439 compromise that effectively recognised papal supremacy. Although Mark of Ephesus was the sole Byzantine participant to refuse assent, several other prelates later withdrew their support upon returning to Constantinople. Many Orthodox clerics repudiated obedience to the unionist patriarch Metrophanes II of Constantinople, while John's brother, Demetrios Palaiologos, launched an unsuccessful assault on Constantinople with Ottoman support in 1442.

=== Ottoman conquest ===
A map of the Eastern Mediterranean, c. 1450

Grateful for the church union, Pope Eugene IV raised funds for Constantinople's defence through indulgences. Between 1444 and 1448, Western leaders organised three campaigns, with the Hungarian general John Hunyadi serving as one of their commanders. The "Long Campaign" reached Adrianople in January 1444, whereas both the Crusade of Varna (1444) and a later campaign that culminated in the Second Battle of Kosovo (1448) ended in defeat. Philip the Good, Duke of Burgundy, was the only western ruler to show sustained interest in anti-Ottoman crusading, commissioning a fleet to combat them which eventually engaged in piracy.

In 1451, the Ottoman sultan Murad II was succeeded by his son Mehmed II, who resolved to capture Constantinople. By then, the city's population had fallen below 50,000, and its garrison numbered under 6,000. Seeking Western aid, Emperor Constantine XI Palaiologos reaffirmed the church union, which provoked local opposition; ultimately, only Genoese and Venetian contingents assisted him. Mehmed captured the city on 29–30 May 1453. By 1461, he had completed the conquest of the Peloponnese.

== Aftermath ==
The fall of Constantinople to Muslim rule and the massacre of thousands of inhabitants caused profound alarm throughout Catholic Europe. The Humanist scholar Aeneas Silvius Piccolomini called the event "a second death for Homer and Plato", alluding to the cultural destruction that followed the Ottoman conquest. He also warned that Ottoman expansion would threaten Hungary and Germany.

The papacy issued bulls proclaiming a crusade in 1453, 1458, and 1463, and established a new office, the camara sanctae cruciatae ("Chamber of the Holy Crusade"), to coordinate crusading efforts. At the Feast of the Pheasant in February 1454, Philip the Good swore to lead a crusade against the Ottomans if another ruler joined him, but the scheme failed. Although printing helped disseminate crusade bulls, increased papal taxation of church revenues aroused resentment. In 1456, crusaders recruited by the Franciscan friar John Capistrano helped Hunyadi repel Mehmed II's siege of Belgrade. Ottoman expansion nonetheless continued: Serbia fell in 1459, much of Bosnia followed in 1463, and Albanian resistance collapsed by 1488.

== Perceptions and prejudices ==
The Byzantines initially perceived an affinity with their Western Christian counterparts. However, conflicts with the Normans of Sicily, the presence of privileged Italian merchants, and the repeated passage of crusading armies substantially altered this outlook. Western ideas of recovering the Holy Land under papal leadership seemed particularly alien. In Byzantine understanding, only the emperor held authority to wage war, and the Holy Land—despite its sanctity—was lost Roman territory. Whereas Westerners described their expeditions in religious terms, such as "pilgrimage" or "path of God", Byzantine sources generally used a more secular vocabulary, referring to "assaults" or "invasions of nations". Anna Komnene, Emperor Alexios I's daughter, asserted that the conquest of Byzantium was the crusader leaders' real objective, the Holy Land serving merely as a pretext. Nevertheless, in correspondence with the papacy and Western rulers, 12th-century emperors emphasised their commitment to defending the Holy Land.

Byzantine diplomacy had provoked resentment among Western envoys before the First Crusade, and produced anti-Byzantine descriptors such as "effeminate" and "idle". This perception endured throughout the Crusades, and Frankish chroniclers, angered by Byzantine accommodation with Muslim neighbours, often depicted the Byzantines as deceitful and treacherous. Bohemond I of Antioch repeated such accusations during his 1107–1108 propaganda campaign before his planned invasion of Byzantium. Largely illiterate Western soldiers viewed Byzantine erudition with disdain, a sentiment they expressed after the Sack of Constantinople through mocking imitations of writing with a quill. Conversely, joint Byzantine–Frankish campaigns against Muslim powers led William of Tyre to commend the bravery of Byzantine soldiers.

== Historiography ==
Highly educated Byzantine officials recorded their experiences for later administrators, establishing what Harris calls "an almost unbroken line of historian bureaucrats". Among them, John Zonaras offers a brief but unreliable account of the First Crusade, while the first detailed Byzantine narrative is Anna Komnene's Alexiad. (Note: Anna, the eldest child of Emperor Alexios I Komnenos, completed her highly laudatory biography of her father several decades after the First Crusade, drawing partly on the notes of her late husband, Nikephoros Bryennios, and partly on his childhood recollections.) John Kinnamos examines the period of Byzantine supremacy, and Niketas Choniates recounts events surrounding the Fourth Crusade. His work was continued by George Akropolites, whose concise account covers the Byzantine restoration; Akropolites's pupil, George Pachymeres, examines the empire's decline. John Kantakouzenos, the only Byzantine emperor to write a memoir, and his supporter Nikephoros Gregoras were among the last Byzantine historians.

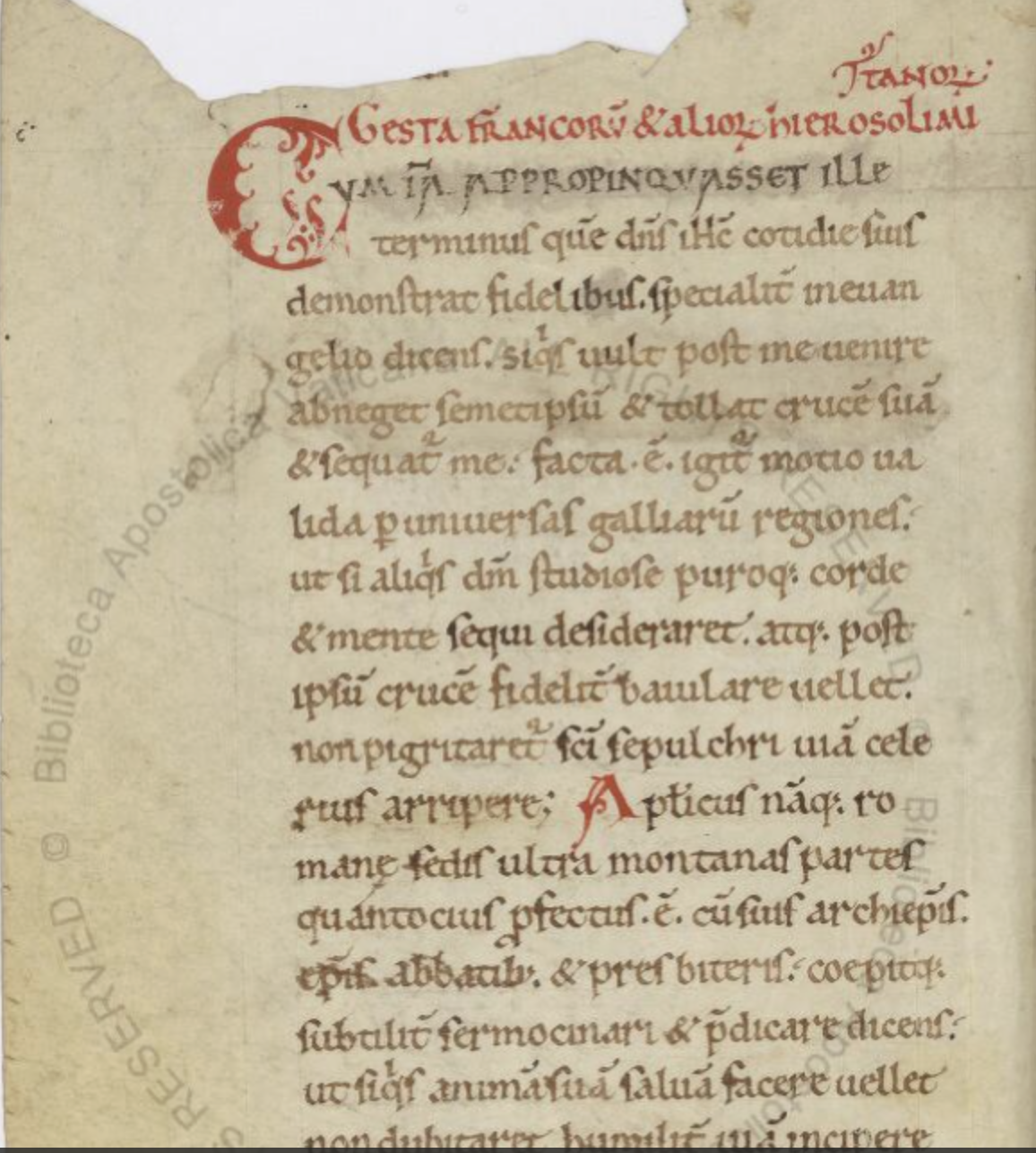
The first folio of the 12th-century Vatican Reginensis manuscript of the Gesta Francorum

The Gesta Francorum—an anonymous Latin account of the First Crusade—shaped early negative Western perceptions of Byzantium (Note: It displays marked hostility towards Emperor Alexios, describing him as "the abominable emperor".) and influenced chroniclers who never visited the Holy Land, including Robert the Monk and Guibert of Nogent. By contrast, Orderic Vitalis portrayed Bohemond's crusade against Byzantium as an attempt "to seize the property of their neighbours", foiled by divine providence. After the Second Crusade, Odo of Deuil criticised Byzantine duplicity, while Otto of Freising avoided such allegations. William of Tyre, writing from a Frankish perspective, is comparatively amicable towards the Byzantines. By contrast, Magnus of Reichersberg incorporated his correspondent's anti-Byzantine criticism into his account of Emperor Frederick's crusade. Byzantine treachery features prominently in Fourth Crusade accounts, such as that of Geoffrey of Villehardouin, while Arnold of Lübeck and Gunther of Pairis present the sack of Constantinople as vengeance. In the later phase of Byzantine decline, Ramon Muntaner's chronicle is a principal source for crusading schemes, while Marino Torsello Sanudo discusses logistics.

The systematic, albeit highly partisan, study of the Crusades began in the 15th century with historians such as Benedetto Accolti. The Fourth Crusade's diversion to Constantinople became a major subject in the late 18th century: Joseph Michaud treated it as an incident, whereas later scholars often attributed it to conspiracies, usually involving the Venetians. From the late 19th century, historians, beginning with Walter Norden, viewed the event as the culmination of tensions between Western and Eastern Christendom. Within this "clash of civilisations" framework, Steven Runciman adopted a pro-Byzantine stance, whereas Warren Treadgold argued that the crusaders delivered the final blow to a decayed structure. The Byzantine role in the crusading movement was long treated only tangentially; among the first specialised studies were Byzantium and the Crusader States by Lilie (1993) and Byzantium and the Crusades by Harris (2006). In traditional Greek and Cypriot historiography, the crusades were generally regarded as manifestations of Western aggression and as an early form of Western colonialism. (Note: For instance, in a 1995 article, the Cypriot historian Aikaterini Aristeidou noted that increased commercial contacts with the West contributed to the development of the Cypriot economy, yet she emphasised that the native Greek population derived little benefit from them.) From the late 20th century onwards, Greek historiography has placed greater emphasis on studying the interaction between indigenous and Western elements in Frankish Greece.

== Legacy ==
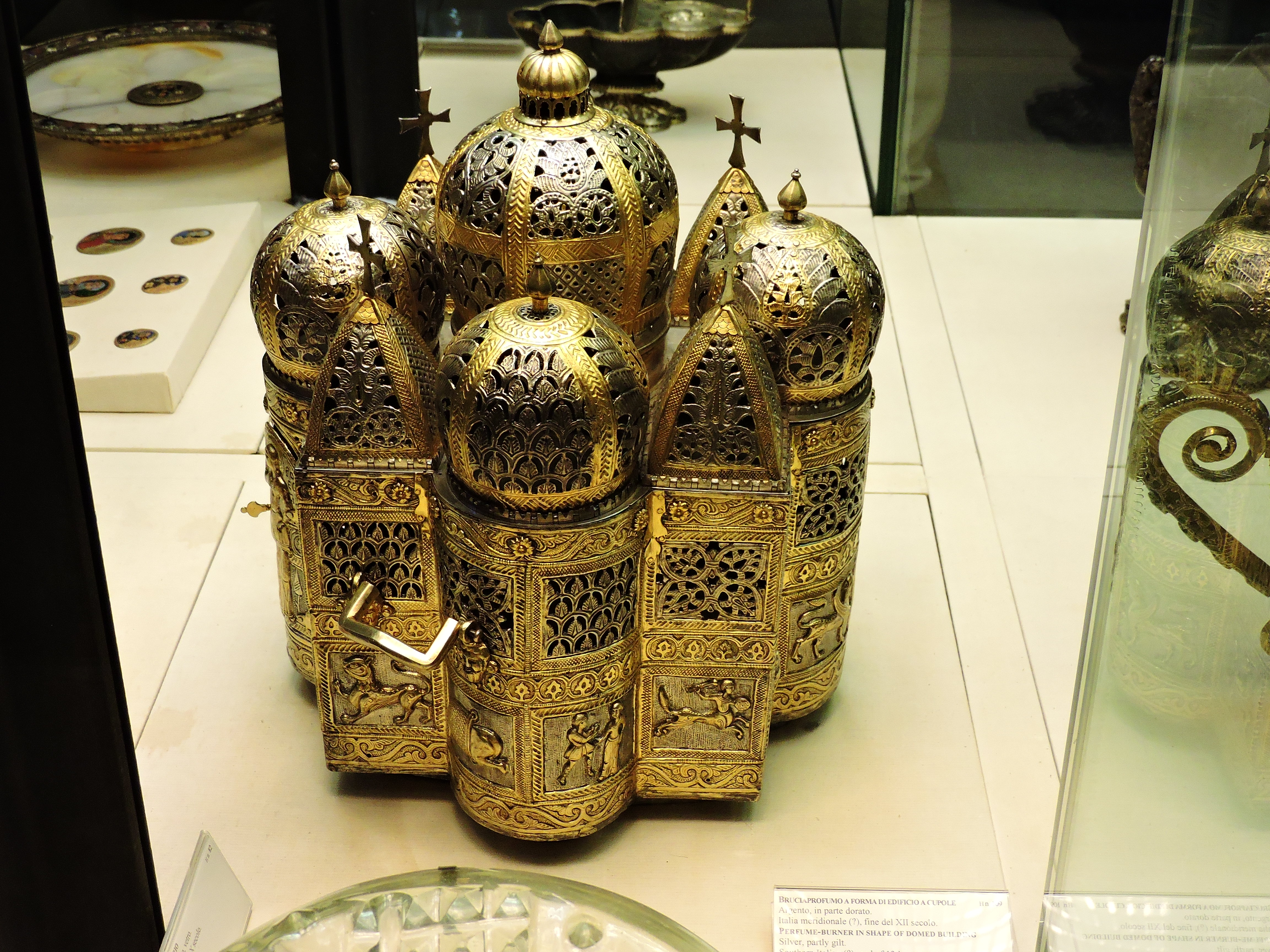
A reliquary brought to Venice among the spoils of the Sack of Constantinople (Treasury of St Mark's Basilica, Venice)

A fusion of Byzantine and Western artistic traditions is evident in the Crusader states, exemplified by the Melisende Psalter produced for Queen Melisende of Jerusalem. Byzantine influence also reached Aragon, where biblical frescoes in the Hospitaller nuns' house at Sigena display comparable features. The Fourth Crusade intensified what the historian Christopher Tyerman terms "a cultural legacy of mistrust and hostility" among the Byzantines. The Sack of Constantinople is still remembered by Greeks as a profound trauma. Crusaders returning from Constantinople enriched their homelands' churches with looted relics, allowing some to become new pilgrimage centres. (Note: The Burgundian crusader Dalmas of Sercey donated the head of St Clement to Cluny Abbey, while Bromholm Priory in England rose markedly in prominence after acquiring a fragment of the True Cross from the spoils of Constantinople.)

Byzantine participation in the crusading movement has rarely appeared in historical fiction; Walter Scott's Count Robert of Paris (1832), set during the First Crusade, is one exception. It depicts the Byzantines as corrupt and duplicitous courtiers, contrasted with vigorous, though sometimes coarse, Westerners. This pattern continues in later Western novels, including James M. Ludlow's Sir Raoul (1905), and remains visible in Alfred Duggan's Count Bohemond (1964), despite changes in assumptions about identity and social roles. A new, though stereotypical, heroine appears in Meg Clothier's The Empress, presenting Agnes of France as a strong female figure directing her own life.

In the context of the Greek liberation movement, Greek historical novels and plays set in Frankish Greece, such as Demetrios Bernardakis's Maria Doxapatri (1858), depicted scenes of national resistance to foreign rule. In Cypriot folklore, the ballad Arodaphnousa centres on a love affair involving the Lusignan king Peter I. His reign has also been depicted in a television serial.

== Bibliography ==
- Andrea, Alfred J. (2008) [2000]. Contemporary Sources for the Fourth Crusade. The Medieval Mediterranean: Peoples, Economies and Cultures, 400–1500. Vol. 29 (Revised ed.). BRILL. ISBN 978-90-04-11740-2.
- Angold, Michael (2017) [2008]. "Belle époque or Crisis; The Greek Rump States and the Recovery of Byzantium". In Shepard, Jonathan (ed.). The Cambridge History of the Byzantine Empire, c. 500–1492. Cambridge University Press. pp. 583–626, 731–758. ISBN 978-0-521-83231-1.
- Backman, Clifford R. (2022) [2009]. The Worlds of Medieval Europe (Fourth ed.). Oxford University Press. ISBN 978-0-1975-7153-8.
- Carr, Mike (2016) [2014]. Merchant Crusaders in the Aegean, 1291–1352. Warfare in History. The Boydell Press. ISBN 978-1-7832-7405-5.
- Chrissis, Nikolaos G. (2013). Crusading in Frankish Greece: A Study of Byzantine-Western Relations and Attitudes, 1204-1282. Brepols. ISBN 978-2-503-53423-7.
- Chrissis, Nikolaos G. (2016). "Byzantine Crusaders: Holy War and Crusade Rhetoric in Byzantine Contacts with the West (1095–1341)". In Boas, Adrian J. (ed.). The Crusader World. The Routledge Worlds. Routledge. pp. 259–277. ISBN 978-0-415-82494-1.
- Chrissis, Nikolaos G. (2021). "Western Aggression and Greco–Latin Interaction: A View from Syria". In Hinz, Felix; Meyer-Hamme, Johannes (eds.). Controversial Histories—Current Views on the Crusades. Engaging the Crusades. Vol. Three. Routledge. pp. 42–44. ISBN 978-0-367-51127-2.
- Coureas, Nicholas (2021). "The Crusades Confront the Orthodox: A Greek Cypriot Viewpoint". In Hinz, Felix; Meyer-Hamme, Johannes (eds.). Controversial Histories—Current Views on the Crusades. Engaging the Crusades. Vol. Three. Routledge. pp. 39–41. ISBN 978-0-367-51127-2.
- Ellenblum, Ronnie (2012). The Collapse of the Eastern Mediterranean: Climate Change and the Decline of the East, 950–1072. Cambridge University Press. ISBN 978-1-1070-2335-2.
- Fine, John V. A. (2009) [1994]. The Late Medieval Balkans: A Critical Survey from the Late Twelfth Century to the Ottoman Conquest. The University of Michigan Press. ISBN 978-0-472-08260-5.
- France, John (2005). The Crusades and the Expansion of Catholic Christendom, 1000–1714. Routledge. ISBN 978-0-415-37127-8.
- Frankopan, Peter (2025). "Byzantium and the Crusades". In Shepard, Jonathan; Frankopan, Peter (eds.). Revisiting the Byzantine Commonwealth: Nodes, Networks, and Spheres. Oxford University Press. pp. 344–358. ISBN 978-0-198-86409-7.
- Hamilton, Bernard (2000). The Leper King and His Heirs: Baldwin IV and the Crusader Kingdom of Jerusalem. Cambridge University Press. ISBN 978-0-5216-4187-6.
- Harris, Jonathan (2022). Byzantium and the Crusades. Bloomsbury Publishing. ISBN 978-1-3501-9978-1.
- Housley, Norman (2001) [1992]. The Later Crusades: From Lyons to Alcazar, 1274–1580. Oxford University Press. ISBN 978-0-19-822136-4.
- Jacoby, David (2017) [2008]. "The Latin Empire of Constantinople and the Frankish States". In Shepard, Jonathan (ed.). The Cambridge History of the Byzantine Empire, c. 500–1492. Cambridge University Press. pp. 759–778. ISBN 978-0-521-83231-1.
- Jaspert, Nikolas (2006) [2003]. The Crusades. Routledge. ISBN 978-0-4153-5968-9.
- Jotischky, Andrew (2017) [2004]. Crusading and the Crusader States (Second ed.). Routledge. ISBN 978-1-1388-0806-5.
- Kolia-Dermitzaki, Athina (2019). "Byzantium and the Crusades in the Komnenian Era: Perception and Reality". In Chrissis, Nikolaos; Kolia-Dermitzaki, Athina; Papageorgiou, Angeliki (eds.). Byzantium and the West: Perception and Reality (11th–15th c.). Routledge. pp. 59–83. ISBN 978-1-138-05974-0.
- Laiou, Angeliki E. (2017) [2008]. "The Palaiologoi and the World Around Them (1261–1400)". In Shepard, Jonathan (ed.). The Cambridge History of the Byzantine Empire, c. 500–1492. Cambridge University Press. pp. 803–833. ISBN 978-0-521-83231-1.
- Lilie, Ralph-Johannes (2004) [1993]. Byzantium and the Crusader States, 1096–1204. Clarendon Press. ISBN 978-0-19-820407-7.
- Lock, Peter (2006). The Routledge Companion to the Crusades. Routledge Companions to History. Routledge. doi:10.4324/9780203389638. ISBN 978-0-415-39312-6.
- Magdalino, Paul (2017) [2008]. "The Empire of the Komnenoi (1118–1204)". In Shepard, Jonathan (ed.). The Cambridge History of the Byzantine Empire, c. 500–1492. Cambridge University Press. pp. 627–663. ISBN 978-0-521-83231-1.
- Nicholson, Helen J. (2019). "Women's Writing and Cultural Patronage". In Bale, Anthony (ed.). The Cambridge Companion to the Literature of the Crusades. Cambridge Companions to Literature. Cambridge University Press. pp. 72–84. ISBN 978-1-1086-7283-2.
- Papadakis, Aristeides (1994). The Christian East and the Rise of the Papacy. The Church in History. Vol. IV. St Vladimir's Seminary Press. ISBN 978-0-88141-057-0.
- Queller, Donald E.; Madden, Thomas F. (1997). The Fourth Crusade: The Conquest of Constantinople. The Middle Ages (Second ed.). University of Pennsylvania Press. ISBN 978-0-8122-1713-1.
- Siberry, Elizabeth (1985). Criticism of crusading : 1095-1274. Clarendon Press. ISBN 978-0-19-821953-8.
- Throop, Susanna A. (2020) [2011]. Crusading as an Act of Vengeance, 1095–1216. Routledge. ISBN 978-0-367-60241-3.
- Treadgold, Warren (1997). A History of the Byzantine State and Society. Stanford University Press. ISBN 978-0-8047-2630-6.
- Tyerman, Christopher (2019). The World of the Crusades: An Illustrated History. Yale University Press. ISBN 978-0-3002-1739-1.
