= Simon Franklin =

Simon Franklin is Professor of Slavonic Studies at the University of Cambridge, UK. He is a Fellow of Clare College.

In 2007 he was awarded the Lomonosov Gold Medal by the Russian Academy of Sciences for outstanding achievements in research in Russian history and culture.

== Selected bibliography ==
- Kazhdan, Alexander; Franklin, Simon (1984). Studies on Byzantine Literature of the Eleventh and Twelfth Centuries. Cambridge: Cambridge University Press. doi:10.1017/CBO9780511735424. ISBN 978-0-511-73542-4.
- Sermons and Rhetoric of Kievan Rus (Harvard University Press, 1991)
- (with Jonathan Shepard) The Emergence of Rus, 750-1200 (Longman, 1996)
- Byzantium - Rus - Russia: Studies in the Translation of Christian Culture Ashgate, 2002
- National Identity in Russian Culture. An Introduction (ed. with Emma Widdis) Cambridge University Press, 2004
- Writing, Society and Culture in Early Rus, c. 950-1300 (Cambridge University Press, 2002)
- Information and Empire. Mechanisms of Communication in Russia, 1600-1850 (ed. with Katherine Bowers) (Open Book Publishers, 2017)
- The Russian Graphosphere 1450-1850 (Cambridge University Press, 2019)
