= The Cambridge History of the Byzantine Empire =

The Cambridge History of the Byzantine Empire

The Cambridge History of the Byzantine Empire c.500–1492 is a history of the Byzantine Empire published by Cambridge University Press in 2008. It was edited by Jonathan Shepard of the University of Cambridge.

The history is made up of 24 chapters in chronological order comprising new and reprinted material, 15 of them having previously appeared in other Cambridge books such as The Cambridge Ancient History and The New Cambridge Medieval History.

== Review ==
In some reviews it was criticized for a lack of coherence in time periods and coverage arising from the stitching together of material from other sources, the fact that some of the material was not completely up to date, and a tendency to concentrate too much on matters outside the empire to the neglect of internal affairs. Some of the new chapters, however, were praised for their original content.
