= Jonathan Shepard =

British historian

Jonathan Shepard FRHistS
- Born: 1948 (age 77–78)

Academic background
- Education: New College, Oxford
- Thesis: Byzantium and Russia in the Eleventh Century: A Study in Political and Ecclesiastical Relations (1974)
- Doctoral advisor: Dimitri Obolensky

Academic work
- Institutions: University of Cambridge
- Notable students: Peter Frankopan
- Notable works: The Emergence of Rus, 750–1200 (with Simon Franklin)

Jonathan Shepard FRHistS (born 1948) is a British historian specialising in early medieval Russia, the Caucasus, and the Byzantine Empire. He is regarded as a leading authority in Byzantine studies and on the Kievan Rus. He specialises in diplomatic and archaeological history of the early Kievan period. Shepard received his doctorate in 1973 from Oxford University and was a lecturer in Russian History at the University of Cambridge. Among other works, he is co-author (with Simon Franklin) of The Emergence of Rus, 750–1200 (1996), and editor of The Cambridge History of the Byzantine Empire (2008).

Among Shepard's theories is that the breakdown in Byzantine-Khazar relations and the shift in Byzantine foreign policy towards allying with the Pechenegs and the Rus against Khazaria was a result of the Khazar conversion to Judaism.

== Selected bibliography ==
=== As author ===
- Shepard, Jonathan (1998) "The Khazars' Formal Adoption of Judaism and Byzantium's Northern Policy" in: Oxford Slavonic Papers; 1998
- Shepard, Jonathan (1997) "Byzantine Soldiers, Missionaries, and Diplomacy under Gibbon's Eyes" in Rosamund McKitterick and Roland Quinault, eds. Edward Gibbon and Empire, Cambridge: U. P., 1997
- Franklin, Simon; Shepard, Jonathan (1996) The Emergence of Rus, 750-1200. London and New York: Longman.
- Shepard, Jonathan (1992) "A Suspected Source of John Scylitzes' Synopsis Historion: the great Catacalon Cecaumenus" in: Byzantine and modern Greek studies.
- Shepard, Jonathan (1975–76) "Scylitzes on Armenia in the 1040s and the role of Catacalon Cecaumenus." Revue des Études Arméniennes, N.S. 11, pp. 269–311.

=== As editor ===
- Shepard, Jonathan, et al., eds. (2008). The Cambridge History of the Byzantine Empire. Cambridge University Press.
- Shepard, Jonathan; Franklin, Simon, eds. (1992) Byzantine Diplomacy: papers of the Twenty-fourth Spring Symposium of Byzantine Studies, Cambridge, March 1990. Aldershot; Brookfield, Vt.: Variorum.
