= Battle of Podandus (878) =

Byzantine victory over the Abbasids

- Part of the Arab–Byzantine wars
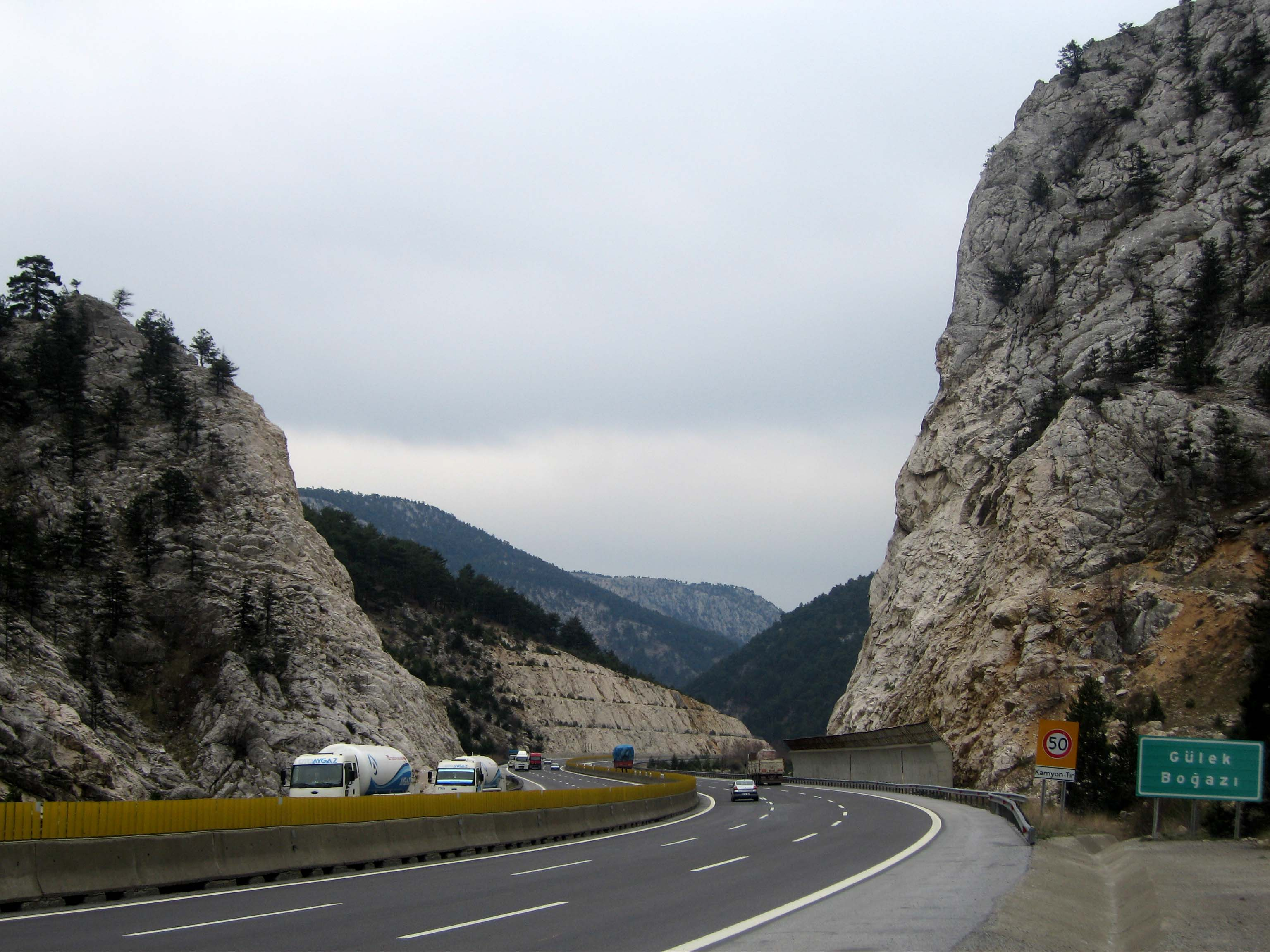
- Modern view of the Gülek Pass, ancient Cilician Gates near Podandus
Date	878
Location	Podandus, Cappadocia, modern day Turkey
Result	Byzantine victory

Belligerents
Byzantine Empire	Abbasid Caliphate: Emirate of Tarsus

Commanders and leaders
Andrew the Scythian	Abdallah ibn Rashid ibn Kawus (WIA) (POW)

Strength
Unknown	40,000 (according to Izz al-Din ibn Shaddad); 4,000 (according to Al-Tabari)

Casualties and losses
Unknown	Near total: 600 escaped

The Battle of Podandus was a military engagement fought between the forces of the Byzantine Empire and the Abbasid Caliphate near Podandus. After a period of mounting Byzantine military successes on the eastern frontier, won by the general Andrew the Scythian, the Abbasids prepared a sizeable army in Cilicia and conducted a raiding expedition into Asia Minor in order to devastate imperial territory. Byzantine forces assembled by Andrew managed to intercept the Abbasids before they could withdraw from Anatolia, and in the ensuing battle the Arab army was virtually destroyed. This victory facilitated a series of Byzantine offensives into Abbasid territory in the following years.

== Background ==
By the late 870s, the forces of the Byzantine Empire had broken the power of the Paulician principality of Tephrike following a decisive victory at the Battle of Bathys Ryax, and subsequent campaigns initiated by the Emperor Basil I. However, while the power of Tephrike waned, threats from the empire's traditional rivals, the Abbasid Caliphate, and in particular its border Emirate of Tarsus, mounted with a series of attacks into Byzantine territory. These raids were countered by the Byzantine general Andrew the Scythian, who as strategos of the Opsikion Theme had won several battles against Abbasid raiding armies and killed or captured numerous warriors. Andrew's feats prompted the emperor to promote him to the rank of domestikos and granted him the status of patrikios. With greater resources and manpower at his disposal, Andrew was able to win even greater victories over the Abbasids, defeating them in several battles and skirmishes, while conducting counterraids into the territory of Melitene and Tarsus.

The exploits of Andrew prompted a significant military response by the emirs of the Al-Thughur. In the summer of 878, the Abbasid governor of Tarsus, Abdallah ibn Rashid, prepared a significant offensive into Byzantine territory to regain the strategic initiative. According to John Skylitzes, Abdallah dispatched a contemptuous letter to Andrew which mocked the Christian dogma of the domestikos, and challenged him to meet the Abbasid invasion in battle. Andrew is said to have hung this letter upon an image of the Theotokos, and via prayer implored the Holy Mother to punish the emir for his insult in the coming battle. Abdallah assembled a considerable force, though the figures assigned to it vary widely between differing sources. Al-Tabari recorded the minimalist figure of 4,000 troops, while ibn Shaddad recorded the far larger (but likely inflated) figure of 40,000 men comprising Abdallah's army. Skylitzes simply describes the Abdallah's army as a "great host". Having assembled his forces, Abdallah crossed the Taurus with his army and initiated his expedition.

== Raid and battle ==
Having crossed the Cilician Gates, Abdallah began his raiding operations in Cappadocia, where his forces were initially successful in collecting plunder. The Abbasids pillaged the countryside while also sacking the fortress of Husnayn and the locality of Maskanln, where a number of prisoners were seized near the underground refuges of the area. Having met little resistance thus far, the Abbasids began their withdrawal towards Cilicia. However, the loot and captives taken encumbered Abdallah's army, and when he reached the vicinity of Podandus he was intercepted by a Byzantine army before he could recross the Cilician Gates.

The Byzantine force arrayed against the Abbasids at Podandus consisted of thematic troops from Seleucia, Pisidia, Koron, and Charsianon and was led by their Domestikos, Andrew the Scythian. With their route of retreat blocked by the Byzantine forces, the cavalrymen of the Abbasid army resorted to a desperate measure by hamstringing their horses, demonstrating a resolve to fight to the death. A battle was joined between the opposing forces, and Abdallah's men, all of whom were now dismounted, attempted to drive back the Byzantines with their skilled and rapid archery, but the Byzantines responded with a quick advance to close the distance and delivered the Arabs a crushing defeat in the close-quarters fighting. The Abbasid force was almost wiped out, with only 500-600 of the Arab warriors managing to escape according to al-Tabari. Abdallah himself was severely wounded and captured by Byzantine forces in the course of the fighting.

== Aftermath ==
Following the battle of Podandus, Abdallah ibn Rashid was sent to Constantinople as a prisoner to Emperor Basil I. However, the following year he was gifted to the autonomous ruler of Egypt, Ahmad ibn Tulun.

The Battle of Podandus and the previous successes won by Andrew the Scythian brought the Byzantines increased momentum in their campaigns on their eastern frontier. In early 879, a Byzantine force under thematic commanders conducted an operation into Abbasid Cilicia, which successfully pillaged the region and defeated an Arab force outside Adana, with 1,400 enemy warriors falling in the encounter. In the summer, Emperor Basil himself conducted a larger expedition directed towards Gemanikeia, while Byzantine troops raided Abbasid Mesopotamia and destroyed the remnants of the Paulician principality via the capture of Tephrike. However, this momentum subsequently faltered when a campaign led by Basil in 882 failed to capture Melitene and its surroundings. Andrew's political position also began to deteriorate. In 882, the Tulunids of Syria led by Halaf al-Fargani into Asia minor proved highly destructive, killing 10,000 people and returning to Syria laiden with booty, with Andrew failing to intercept the Arabs on this occasion. Furthermore, Andrew was alleged to have supported a conspiracy by Basil's son Leo, and this implication caused a rift to develop between him and the emperor. The ultimate consequence of this was Basil's dismissal of Andrew and his replacement as domestikos by Kesta Styppiotes. Kesta attempted a conquest of Tarsus in 883, but suffered a disastrous defeat during a daring night attack at Chrysoboullon, conducted by the new Tarsiote Emir Yazaman al-Khadim. Andrew was reappointed as domestikos by Basil as a result of Kesta's death in this reversal.

== Bibliography ==
- Treadgold, Warren (1997). A History of the Byzantine State and Society. Stanford, California: Stanford University Press. ISBN 978-0804779371.
- Wortley, John, ed. (2010). John Skylitzes: A Synopsis of Byzantine History, 811–1057. Cambridge: Cambridge University Press. ISBN 978-0-521-76705-7.
- Vasiliev, A. A. (1968). Byzance et les Arabes, Tome II, 1ére partie: Les relations politiques de Byzance et des Arabes à L'époque de la dynastie macédonienne (867–959) (in French). French ed.: Henri Grégoire, Marius Canard. Brussels: Éditions de l'Institut de Philologie et d'Histoire Orientales.
- Lilie, Ralph-Johannes; Ludwig, Claudia; Pratsch, Thomas; Zielke, Beate (2013). Prosopographie der mittelbyzantinischen Zeit Online. Berlin-Brandenburgische Akademie der Wissenschaften. Nach Vorarbeiten F. Winkelmanns erstellt (in German). Berlin and Boston: De Gruyter.
- Tobias, Norman (2007). Basil I, Founder of the Macedonian Dynasty: A Study of the Political and Military History of the Byzantine Empire in the Ninth Century. ISBN 978-0773454057.
