= Battle of Kibyrrhaiotai coast =

898 naval battle of the Arab–Byzantine wars

Battle of Kibyrrhaiotai coast (898)
- Part of the Arab–Byzantine wars
- Map of the Arab–Byzantine naval conflict in the Mediterranean, 7th–11th centuries
| Date | August 898 |
| Location | Off the coast of Cibyrrhaeot Theme |
| Result | Abbasid victory |

Belligerents
| Abbasid Caliphate: Emirate of Tarsus | Byzantine Empire |

Commanders and leaders
| Raghib the eunuch | Unknown |

Casualties and losses
| Few | Many ships burned 3,000 sailors killed |

The Battle of Kibyrrhaiotai coast was a military engagement between an Arab Tarsiote fleet and a Byzantine fleet off the coast of Cibyrrhaeot theme. The Tarsiote fleet inflicted a crushing defeat on the Byzantine navy.

During the 9th century, the Abbasids began rebuilding their naval forces in Cilicia, and by the year 860, squadrons based at Tarsos were sufficiently powerful to attack the southern coasts of Anatolia. Tarsos grew to be such a menace to Byzantine territory that in 883 a sizable force led by the domestic of the schools, Kesta Styppiotes, was dispatched against it; however, its governor, Yazaman al-Khadim, attacked him at night while he was unprepared, defeated him, and killed him. From 882 until his death in 891, Yazaman served as Tarsos' amir and gained notoriety for his maritime naval raids. Following his death, Tarsos was occupied by the rulers of the Tulunids of Egypt until 897 and subsequently the Abbasids, who all carried on the yearly incursions into Byzantine territory. In August of 897, the Arabs of Tarsos sacked the capital of the theme of Cappadocia.

In the summer of 898, the Arabs of Tarsos launched a naval raid. This fleet was led by the eunuch Ragib, a client of Al-Muwaffaq, a brother of the Caliph al-Mu'tamid. The Tarsiote fleet encountered a Byzantine fleet, which was probably from the theme of Cibyrrhaeot, which was guarding the coasts of South Asia Minor. There the Arabs inflicted a crushing defeat on them. The Byzantines suffered heavy losses; their ships were captured and burned, and 3,000 sailors were killed. Afterwards, the Arabs raided the Cibyrrhaeot theme by land and captured many coastal fortresses. After this victory, the Arabs returned to Tarsos with their ships without major losses. The exact location of the battle is unknown, but the battle happened around August.

The battle was a great victory for the Muslims, as it weakened the Byzantine fleet, which was protecting the coasts of the empire. It also paved the way for further Muslim raids into the Aegean Sea, especially in the years 902-904, which included the sack of Thessalonica by the Byzantine renegade Leo of Tripoli.

== Sources ==
- Shaun Tougher (2021), The Reign of Leo VI (886-912): Politics and People.
- Alexander Vasiliev (1968), Byzantium and the Arabs, Vol. 2: Political relations between Byzantines and Arabs during the Macedonian Dynasty (In French).
- John H. Pryor (2006), The Age of the Dromōn; The Byzantine Navy Ca 500-1204.
