= Germanikeia Campaign (879) =

- Part of the Arab–Byzantine wars
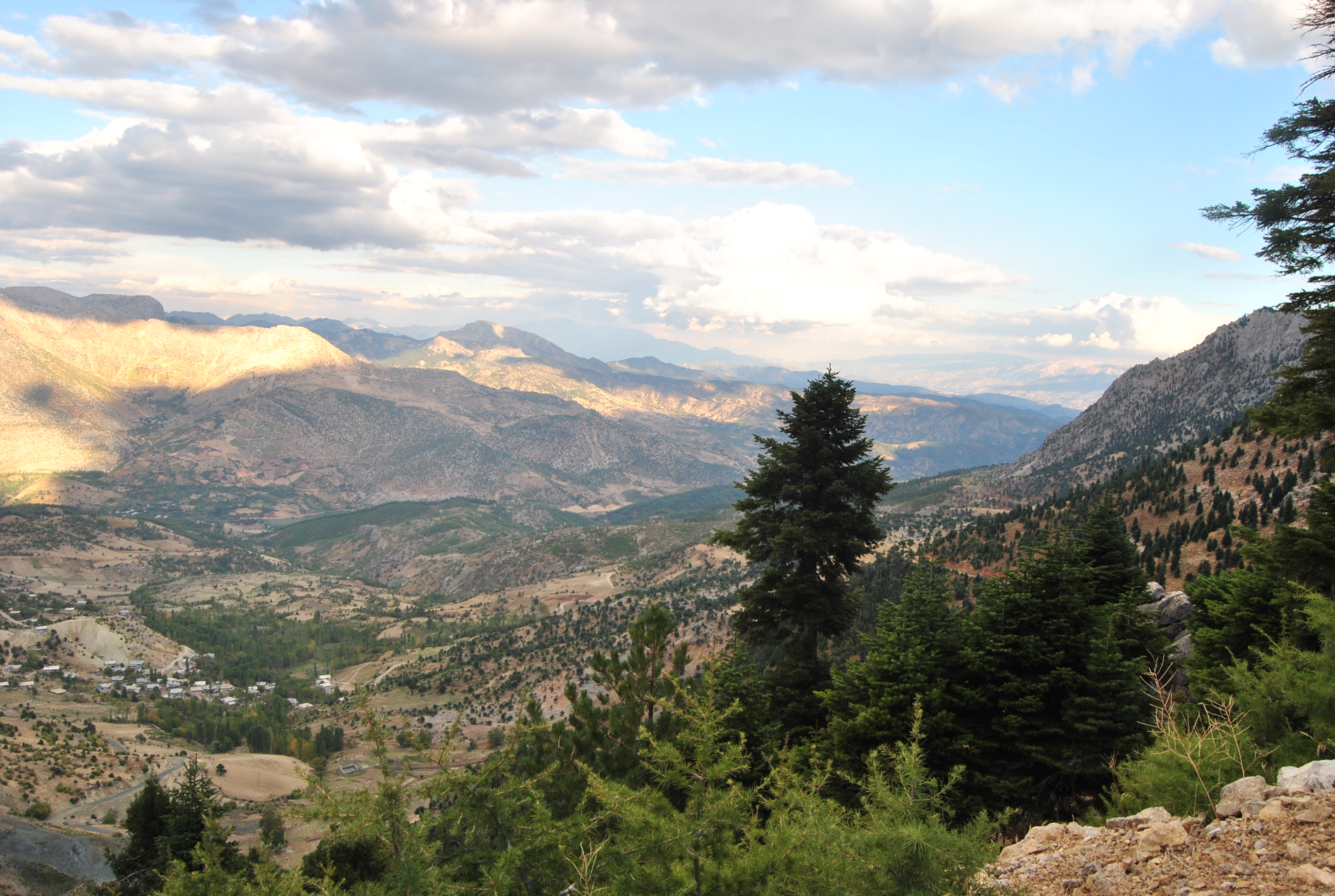
- Modern view of the landscape in Kahramanmaraş
Date	Spring – Autumn 879
Location	Tephrike, Germanikeia (modern Kahramanmaraş) & Al-Jazira (modern Diyarbakır)
Result	Byzantine victory: Fall of the Paulician principality

Belligerents
Byzantine Empire	Abbasid Caliphate: Emirate of Tarsus; Paulician principality of Tephrike	Tulunid Emirate

Commanders and leaders
Basil I Constantine	Abd’Allah; Sima al-Twawil; Abdelomeler	Sima

Strength
30,000	Unknown	300

Casualties and losses
Unknown	Heavy	Heavy

The Germanikeia Campaign of 879 was the central thrust of the three-pronged Byzantine offensive launched by Emperor Basil I against the Abbasid Caliphate and Paulician principality. Basil's army achieved considerable success in raiding and plundering in the provinces of Melitene and Germanikeia, though this expedition was also marked by the spirited resistance of the people of Geron, which defied all of the emperor's attempts to capture the fortress. Supplementary operations conducted by Basil's subcommanders brought more widespread success, with one column attaining victories in Mesopotamia, while another brought an end to the Paulician state via the siege and capture of Tephrike.

== Background ==
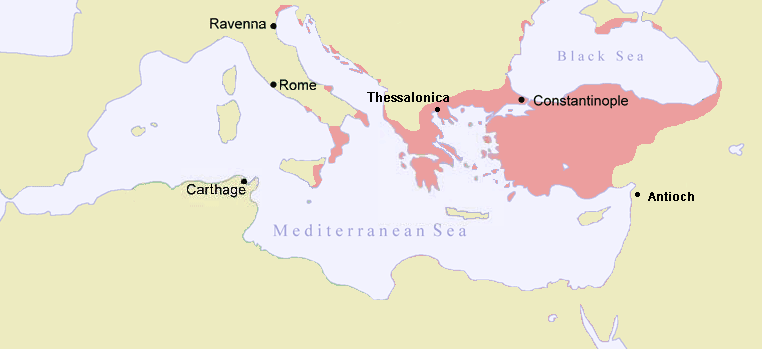
The Byzantine Empire in 867

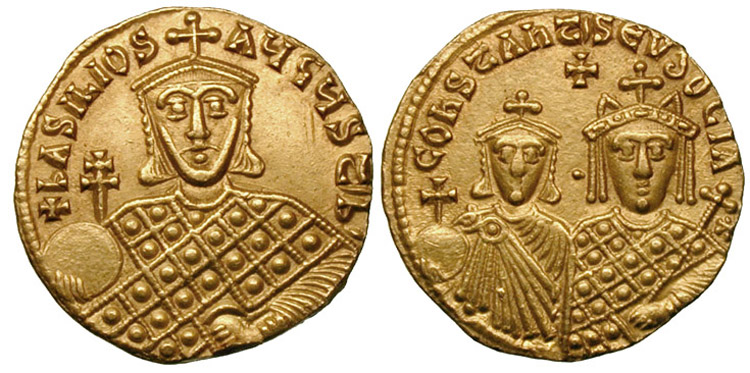
Solidus depicting the busts of emperor Basil I, his son Constantine, and his wife Eudocia Ingerina

In the 870s, the Byzantine Empire had gradually gained the upper hand in its conflicts on the eastern frontier against the Paulicians and the Abbasids. The Byzantines gained increasing momentum with their victories over the Paulicians at the Battle of Bathys Ryax and the success won by Andrew the Scythian against the Abbasids at the Battle of Podandus. In January 879, a Byzantine army under thematic strategoi exploited the depletion of Tarsiote forces from Andrew's exploits and conducted an invasion of Cilicia, plundering and devastating the region and defeating an Abbasid force near Adana, with 1,400 Arab warriors falling in the battle. The string of Byzantine successes in the late 870s encouraged Emperor Basil to lead another, more ambitious offensive in person later in 879, intended to strike enemy holdings along the length of the Al-Thughur.

== Campaign ==
=== Warfare along the Al-Thughur ===
In the spring, Basil began his advance eastwards, with his son Constantine accompanying him. He stopped at Caesara and established a camp there. He conducted drilling maneuvers for most of his troops, but dispatched a select body of his men as a vanguard force to clear the path for his advance. This column advanced through the arid terrain of eastern Cappadocia, to the borderlands of the Al-Thughur. There, the vanguard attacked and captured the Arab-held fortresses of Psilokastron and Phyrokastron, imprisoning the surviving people. A third fortress, Phalakros, surrendered to the Byzantines due to their swift advance and capture of the previous two. The emir of Anazarbos, Abd’Allah son of Amr, appears to have attempted to resist the Byzantine vanguard column, alongside the Abbasid army of Melitene. However, when Basil rejoined the vanguard with his main army, Abd’Allah and the Melitene troops fled before the Byzantines. With no opposition on the field, the emperor's soldiers stormed and destroyed the fortresses of Kasarma, Karva, and Endelekhone, while two other fortresses in the vicinity of Melitene, Ardala and Eremosykea, surrendered to the Byzantines. At this juncture, the Emir of Tarsus Sima al-Twawil, who was renowned for prior raids into Byzantine territory, defected to Basil.

Pressing his advantage, Basil crossed the Onopniktes and Sarus rivers and advanced to Koukousos. He employed counter-guerilla tactics against the resisting Arab forces, clearing the dense brush that dominated the terrain, paving roads for logistics and taking and destroying the locations used as refuges for enemy insurgents. The Byzantines captured the fortresses of Kalipolis and Padasia, but when they pressed on towards the Taurus Mountains, they encountered extremely harsh terrain, prompting the emperor himself to dismount and march in front of his men to encourage them forward. Basil and his troops were thus able to pass through the Taurus and reach the vicinity of Germanikeia.

=== Attack on Germanikeia and Siege of Geron ===
When the Byzantines crossed the Taurus, they discovered that the Abbasid forces in the region had declined to face them in open battle, instead opting to withdraw into their fortified stronghold at Germanikeia. Unwilling to become bogged down in a siege of the stronghold, Basil instead had his troops lay waste to the surrounding territory to inflict economic damage, before marching further against Adata. The Arabs of Adata pursued the same defensive strategy as those of Germanikeia, with the result that Basil's men burned everything in the environs of the location.

After ravaging Adata's surroundings, Basil advanced against the fortified town of Geron, investing the settlement and conducting assaults against its walls. In spite of Basil's use of siege engines, the inhabitants of Geron resisted and repulsed the Byzantine attempts to storm the town. Impressed by the vigour of the defenders, Basil called a truce and, according to the version preserved by John Skylitzes, inquired as to why the people of Geron fought with such resolve. Supposedly, the Arabs of Geron believed in a prophecy in which the town would only be taken by a Byzantine whose name was Constantine. The emperor responded by displaying his son Constantine, but the defenders responded that only another one of Basil's descendants with the same name would be able to conquer Geron in a later era. Incensed by the defiance of Geron's folk, Basil resumed the siege with intense pressure. However, the Byzantines were still unable to make progress, and with a sudden onset of cold and wet weather that made conditions for the besiegers harsher, Basil ultimately lifted the siege and began the process of withdrawing his army. (Note: Alexander Vasiliev cautioned that, if Basil's son Constantine was present during the triumph following the Campaign, the Byzantine army must have withdrawn to Asia Minor before September 879. In that case the claims of Theophanes Continuatus and Cedrenus that Basil withdrew due to the onset of Winter may be erronious)

=== Return to Asia Minor and offensives in other regions ===
Seeking to prevent his army from becoming overburdened and slowed in its withdrawal, Basil ordered the execution of the majority of the Arab prisoners his army had collected during their offensive. The display of brutality may have been a response to Basil's failure at Geron, and was intended as an act of terror to demoralize his enemy. Nonetheless, the initiation of Basil's retreat of the Byzantine army finally encouraged the Abbasid forces to march out of their fortifications to harass and frustrate the Byzantines' on their return journey. However, the emperor had anticipated the development and had stationed rearguard detachments in concealed positions to intercept the emerging Arab forces. The concealed Byzantine forces ambushed and destroyed the pursuing Abbasid contingents, killing and capturing numerous Arab warriors. So heavy were these defeats that a leading military leader of the Cilician Abbasids, named Abdelomeler in Greek sources, was compelled to enter negotiations with Basil in order to defect to the Byzantines. Another engagement during the withdrawal may have been the one described by al-Tabari, wherein the 300-strong Tulunid cavalry force under Sima (a prefect of the Tulunid ruler Ahmad ibn Tulun, not to be confused with the defector Sima al-Twawil), fought a skirmish against a larger, 4,000-strong Byzantine army near Heraclea. Though the result is not mentioned by al-Tabari, Alexander Vasiliev believed the Tulunid detachment was attempting to harass the retreating Byzantines and clashed with their rear-guard, and that the encounter ended in defeat for the smaller Tulunid force. Having secured their rear with these successes, the Byzantines were able to recross the Taurus and return to Asia Minor.

When Basil returned to Caesarea, he received news of successes attained by other Byzantine forces conducting operations on the eastern frontier. It was likely during these operations that a Byzantine army under Basil's son-in-law, Christopher, besieged and captured Tephrike, bringing an end to the Paulician principality. Another column won victories over Abbasid armies in Koloneia and in northern Al-Jazira (near Diyarbakır), taking large numbers of Arab and Kurdish warriors as prisoners, while pillaging enemy territories to amass great quantities of plunder and additional captives. The spoils of the offensive were sent back to Caesarea and received by Basil, but the emperor once again executed every one of these captives in order to avoid hindering further operations. Upon reaching Dorylaeum, he distributed gifts to his men for their service in the campaign, before dismissing them to their winter quarters. Basil himself then continued his return to Constantinople, which he entered in a triumphal ceremony, alongside Constantine, shortly prior to the death of the latter.

== Aftermath ==
The great successes achieved by Basil's forces in 879 encouraged further offensives by the Byzantines over the Al-Thughur. However, Abbasid resistance remained formidable despite the recent setbacks. In 881, a Byzantine siege of Melitene was repulsed, while in 882, Basil launched a second offensive into the region of Germanikeia, but as had been the case at Geron three years prior, his attempted sieges of both this city and of Hadath were repulsed by the defending garrisons. The Byzantines met an even greater defeat in the following year when the Domestikos Kesta Styppiotes conducted an expedition to take Tarsus. The Abbasid Emir Yazaman al-Khadim led his forces out and decisively defeated Kesta's troops in a surprise attack at the Battle of Chrysoboullon.

== Bibliography ==
- Treadgold, Warren (1997). A History of the Byzantine State and Society. Stanford, California: Stanford University Press. ISBN 978-0804779371.
- Wortley, John, ed. (2010). John Skylitzes: A Synopsis of Byzantine History, 811–1057. Cambridge: Cambridge University Press. ISBN 978-0-521-76705-7.
- Vasiliev, A. A. (1968). Byzance et les Arabes, Tome II, 1ére partie: Les relations politiques de Byzance et des Arabes à L'époque de la dynastie macédonienne (867–959) (in French). French ed.: Henri Grégoire, Marius Canard. Brussels: Éditions de l'Institut de Philologie et d'Histoire Orientales.
- Lilie, Ralph-Johannes; Ludwig, Claudia; Pratsch, Thomas; Zielke, Beate (2013). Prosopographie der mittelbyzantinischen Zeit Online. Berlin-Brandenburgische Akademie der Wissenschaften. Nach Vorarbeiten F. Winkelmanns erstellt (in German). Berlin and Boston: De Gruyter.
- Kazhdan, Alexander, ed. (1991). The Oxford Dictionary of Byzantium. Oxford and New York: Oxford University Press. ISBN 0-19-504652-8.
