= Thughur Campaign of Basil I (873) =

Military campaigns, 873

- Part of the Arab–Byzantine wars
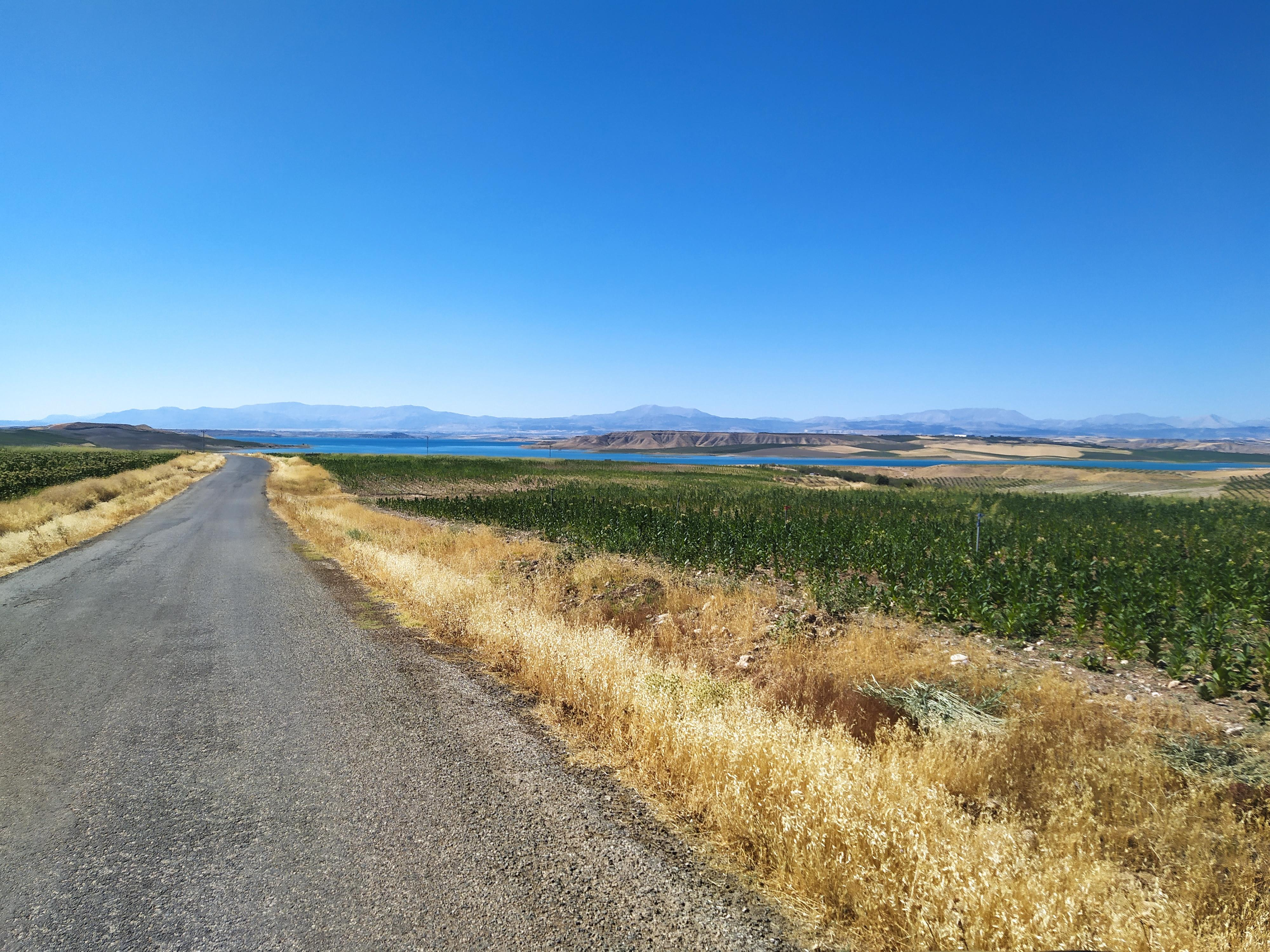
- Modern view of the plains and mountains in Samsat, ancient Samosata
Date	Spring – Summer 873
Location	Asia minor, Samosata, Melitene
Result	Limited Byzantine victory (Note: The strategic objectives of the campaign were the capture of Sozopetra, Samosata and Melitene. Basil's army was successful in capturing the first two, but failed to capture Melitene) (Note: The Byzantines made territorial gains during the offensive, over which they were able to consolidate their control in the following years) Full results: Siege of Sozopetra: Byzantine victory; Siege of Samosata: Byzantine victory; Battle of Melitene: Byzantine victory; Siege of Melitene: Abbasid victory; Expedition against the Paulicians: Byzantine victory

Belligerents
Byzantine Empire	Abbasid Caliphate: Emirate of Melitene; Paulician principality

Commanders and leaders
Basil I Nasr al-Iqritashi †	Ahmed bin Mohammed al-Qabus

Strength
Unknown	Unknown

Casualties and losses
Heavy	Heavy

The Thughur Campaign of 873 was an offensive conducted by the Byzantine Empire along the eastern Al-Thughur frontier regions, under the personal command of Emperor Basil I. The campaign was directed against the empire's main enemies in the east, the Abbasid Caliphate and the Paulician principality. The Byzantines succeeded in capturing numerous fortresses and the cities of Sozopetra and Samosata, while attaining a victory in battle near Melitene. However, Basil's attempt to capture Melitene ended in defeat, thus partially offsetting the strategic success of these offensives. Nonetheless, the Byzantines were able to conclude their campaign with a ruinous attack into Paulician territory, after which the emperor returned in triumph to Constantinople.

== Background ==
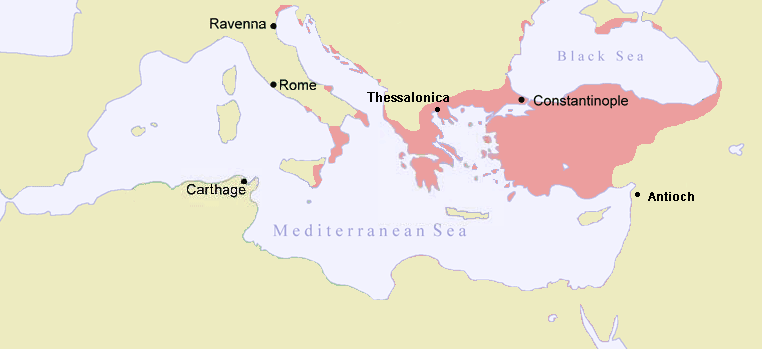
The Byzantine Empire in 867

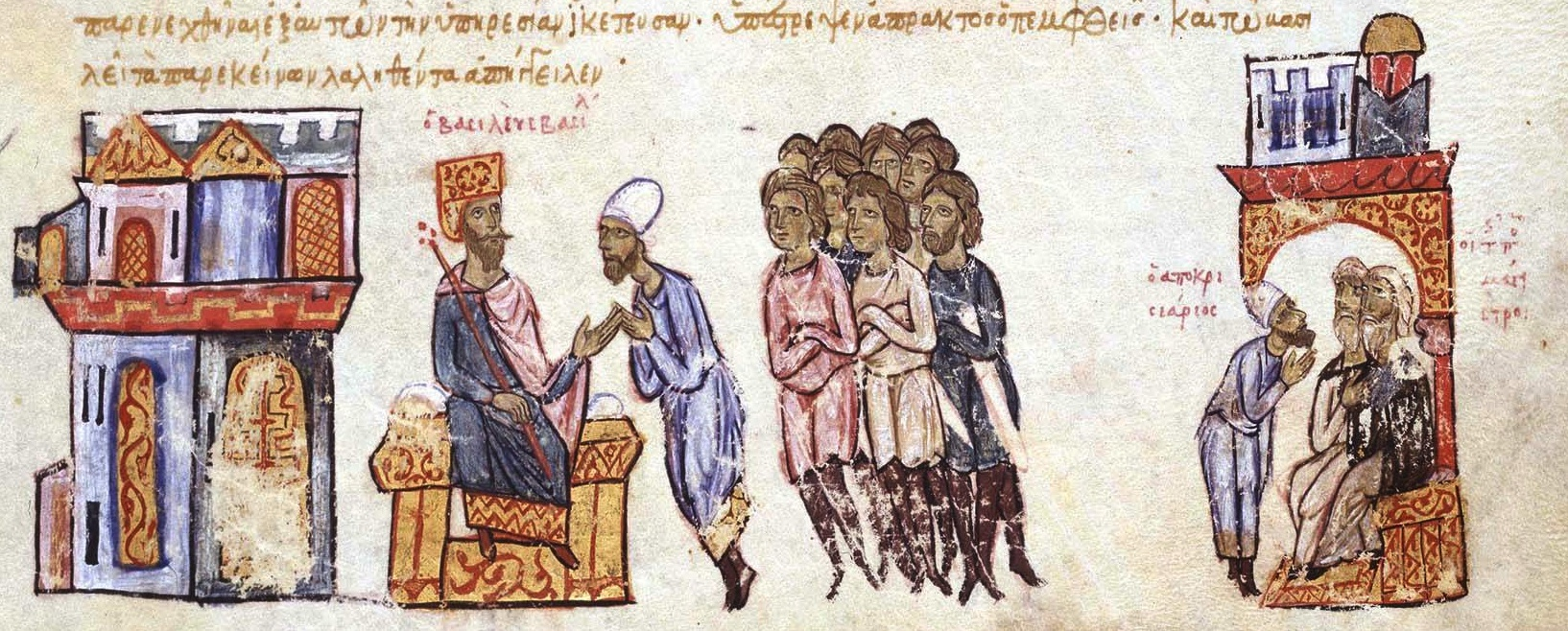
Basil I on his throne, as depicted in the Madrid Skylitzes

In the early 870s, the Byzantine Empire had been engaged in a conflict on its eastern frontier, both against its traditional enemy, the Abbasid Caliphate, and the Paulician principality of Tephrike, which had allied with the Arabs. After an attempt to negotiate peace with the Paulicians was rebuffed by their leader Chrysocheir in 870, emperor Basil conducted a campaign against them, only to be defeated and almost captured. Their victory had enabled the Paulicians to intensify their raids into Byzantine territory, attacking as far as Ancyra. However, in 872 Basil appointed his son-in-law, Christopher, as Domestikos, and dispatched him at the head of an army drawn from the Armeniakon and Charsianon themes to intercept Chrysocheir near Dazimon. At the Battle of Bathys Ryax, the Byzantines won a decisive victory over the Paulicians, after which they pursued Chrysocheir to Sebasteia, where he was betrayed by his followers and promptly executed by the Byzantines. Chrysocheir’s head was brought to Basil in Constantinople. Following this victory, the Byzantines sought to launch offensives along the eastern frontier to maintain their strategic initiative, and Basil himself prepared a second expedition into Eastern Anatolia for the year 873. (Note: The Abbasid Caliphate experienced severe internal strife at this time, a geopolitical factor which further encouraged Basil to launch his campaign in 873 as Sozopetra, Samosata and Melitne were unlikely to receive sufficient assistance from Baghdad.)

== Campaign ==
=== Capture of Sozopetra and Samosata ===
Arriving at the operating base of Sebasteia near the Al-Thughur frontier in the spring of 873, Basil immediately reaped the strategic benefits of Christopher's victory the previous year, when the Armenian Paulician ruler of Lokana surrendered his city to the emperor. The city of Taranta had also submitted to the Byzantines before the arrival Basil, and both locations were of strategic importance in securing the route of advance towards Samosata and Melitene. Basil detached part of his army and sent them against the Sozopetra. The contingent managed to capture the city, after which it rapidly advanced towards Samosata. The soldiers crossed through a narrow defile, which allowed them evade detection while they advanced towards Samosata. They then stormed the underprepared city, killing and capturing vast numbers of Samosata's inhabitants, while freeing prisoners taken by the Arabs and Paulicians in previous years. The Byzantines then sacked the city and burned the surrounding territory. These soldiers then crossed the Euphrates, plundering the territory on its eastern bank to collect great quantities of loot and prisoners, before returning to re-join the emperor, who had encamped on the river Atzarnouk.

=== Battle and Siege of Melitene ===
With his army reunited, the emperor broke camp and began his advance towards Melitene. The Byzantine advance was delayed when they found the Euphrates in summer flood, forcing them to construct a bridge to cross it. On the other bank, the Byzantines plundered Abbasid territory and captured a fortified town called Rhapsakion, after which Basil again detached a separate column to devastate the lands between the river Arsinos and the Euphrates. The attack proved highly destructive, sacking the towns of Karkikion, Chachon, Aman, Mourex and Abdela.

Meanwhile, the column under Basil himself continued its advance against Melitene. As the emperor's forces had been divided, the regional Abbasid armies of the region arrayed themselves against the Byzantines to fight a pitched battle beneath the walls of Melitene. Basil promptly engaged the Abbasids in battle, personally leading the attack, and defeated them. The Byzantines pursued the defeated Arabs, killing or capturing large numbers of their warriors, and forced the survivors inside the walls of Melitene. The grounds outside the fortifications of the city were said to have been littered with the corpses of the fallen caliphate soldiers.

Having attained victory outside the city, Basil intended to capture Melitene itself. According to John Skylitzes, he intended to use siege engines, but when he learned from Arab deserters how well the city was defended, and that it had prepared a large quantity of provisions to survive a siege, Basil instead opted to divert his attack towards Paulician territory. However, according to modern scholars, the Byzantine sources may conceal unwelcome details which are described in Arab accounts. According to Al-Tabari, a Byzantine assault against Melitene was defeated by the Abbasid defenders led by Ahmed bin Mohammed al-Qabus, being repulsed with heavy losses. In particular, the loss of a patrikios named Nasr al-Iqritashi (Nasr the Cretan) was emphasized. (Note: The previous division of the Byzantine army with one column sent to raid near the Arsinos may have contributed to Basil's failure at Melitene, as his whole army was not present during the siege.)

=== Expedition against the Paulicians ===
Basil's failure at Melitene had tempered the prestige gained in an otherwise successful campaign. Consequently, after lifting his siege of the city following his army's repulse by its defenders, Basil turned his army against Paulician territory to win compensating successes. The Byzantines burned and desolated the Paulician lands, and managed to capture the fortresses of Argaon, Kontakion, Stephanou, and Rachat. Having thus restored Byzantine prestige to an extent, the Emperor and his army retired to Asia Minor.

== Aftermath ==
After reaching Asia Minor, Basil began his return journey to Constantinople, where he celebrated a triump. As a religious gesture for the victories his armies had achieved, he issued a decree that the Jewish population of Byzantium be converted to Christianity. The emperor also received new that the Patriarch of Constantinople Photios had conducted a genealogy recreation, connecting Basil's ancestry with the ancient Parthian and Armenian Arsacid Dynasty, thus providing Basil with a significant propagandistic boon in establishing his legitimacy. Over the following years, the emperor delegated operations along the Al-Thughur frontier to his generals, such as the Domestikos Andrew the Scythian, before leading another campaign to the east in person in 879.

== Bibliography ==
- McCormick, Michael (1990). Eternal Victory: Triumphal Rulership in Late Antiquity, Byzantium and the Early Medieval West. Cambridge: Cambridge University Press. ISBN 978-0-521-38659-3.
- Treadgold, Warren (1997). A History of the Byzantine State and Society. Stanford, California: Stanford University Press. ISBN 978-0804779371.
- Wortley, John, ed. (2010). John Skylitzes: A Synopsis of Byzantine History, 811–1057. Cambridge: Cambridge University Press. ISBN 978-0-521-76705-7.
- Vasiliev, A. A. (1968). Byzance et les Arabes, Tome II, 1ére partie: Les relations politiques de Byzance et des Arabes à L'époque de la dynastie macédonienne (867–959) (in French). French ed.: Henri Grégoire, Marius Canard. Brussels: Éditions de l'Institut de Philologie et d'Histoire Orientales.
- Tobias, Norman (2007). Basil I, Founder of the Macedonian Dynasty: A Study of the Political and Military History of the Byzantine Empire in the Ninth Century. ISBN 978-0773454057.
