= 883 =

Calendar year

883 in various calendars
Gregorian calendar	883; DCCCLXXXIII
Ab urbe condita	1636
Armenian calendar	332; ԹՎ ՅԼԲ
Assyrian calendar	5633
Balinese saka calendar	804–805
Bengali calendar	289–290
Berber calendar	1833
Buddhist calendar	1427
Burmese calendar	245
Byzantine calendar	6391–6392
Chinese calendar	壬寅年 (Water Tiger); 3580 or 3373 — to — 癸卯年 (Water Rabbit); 3581 or 3374
Coptic calendar	599–600
Discordian calendar	2049
Ethiopian calendar	875–876
Hebrew calendar	4643–4644
- Hindu calendars
Vikram Samvat	939–940
Shaka Samvat	804–805
Kali Yuga	3983–3984
Holocene calendar	10883
Iranian calendar	261–262
Islamic calendar	269–270
Japanese calendar	Gangyō 7 (元慶７年)
Javanese calendar	781–782
Julian calendar	883; DCCCLXXXIII
Korean calendar	3216
Minguo calendar	1029 before ROC 民前1029年
Nanakshahi calendar	−585
Seleucid era	1194/1195 AG
Thai solar calendar	1425–1426
Tibetan calendar	ཆུ་ཕོ་སྟག་ལོ་ (male Water-Tiger); 1009 or 628 or −144 — to — ཆུ་མོ་ཡོས་ལོ་ (female Water-Hare); 1010 or 629 or −143

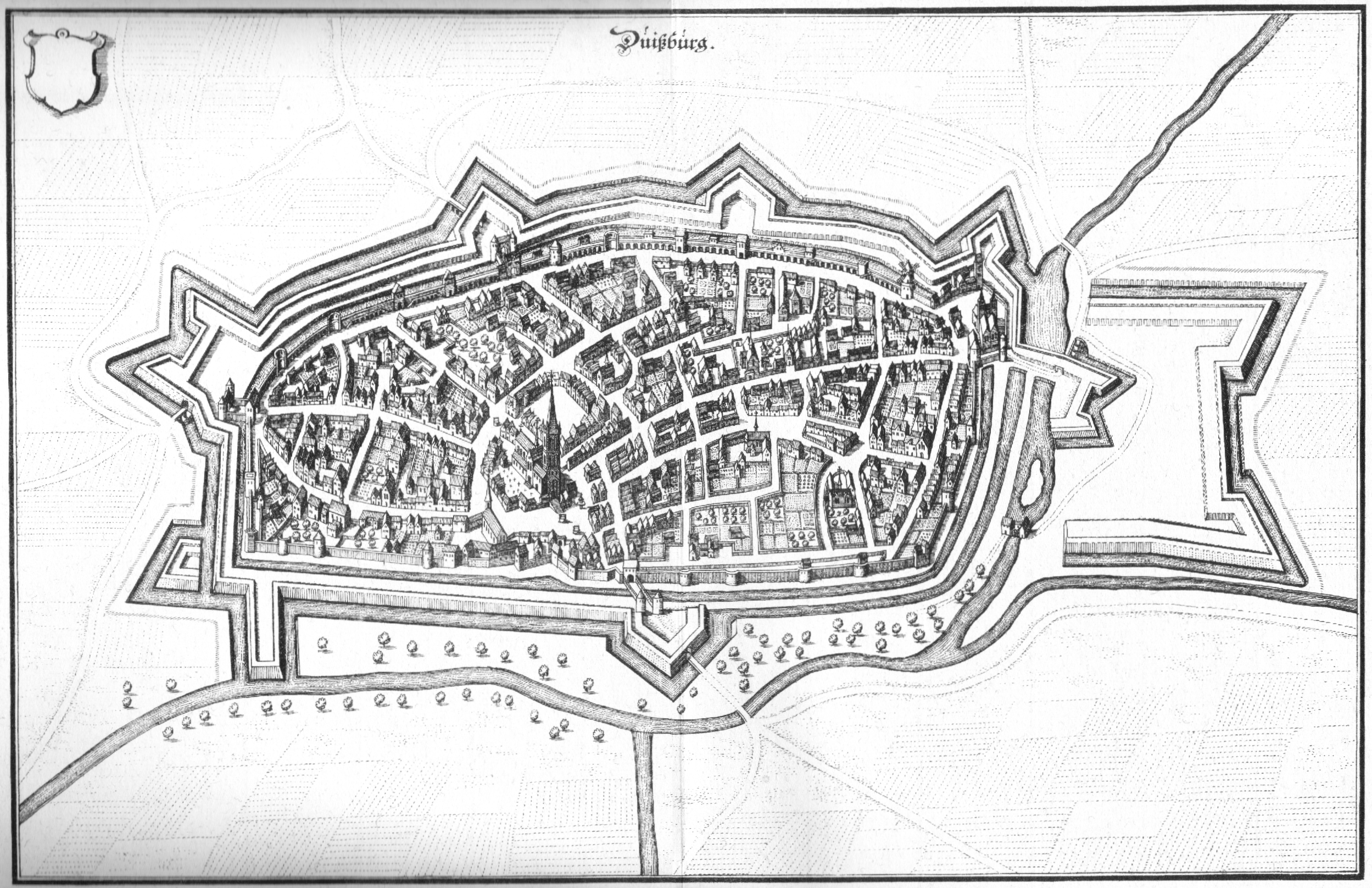
Duisburg by Matthäus Merian (1647)

Year 883 (DCCCLXXXIII) was a common year starting on Tuesday of the Julian calendar.

== Events ==
=== By place ===
==== Europe ====
- Spring – Viking raiders ravage Flanders, and sack the abbey at Saint-Quentin. King Carloman II blocks their passage at Laviers, which had been on the banks of the Somme. Meanwhile, Vikings enter the Rhine, but are turned back by Henry of Franconia (possibly a margrave of Saxony). They over-winter at Duisburg.
- King Charles the Fat travels to Nonantola (Northern Italy), where he meets Pope Marinus I. He receives complaints of Guy II of Spoleto, who is the official "protector" of Rome, and invades the Papal States. King Charles orders Guy to appear before a tribunal.
- Guy II of Spoleto begins a revolt, and assembles an army supported with Arab auxiliaries. King Charles the Fat sends Berengar of Friuli with an expeditionary force to deprive him of Spoleto. An epidemic ravages Berengar's army, and forces them to retire.
- Svatopluk I, ruler (knyaz) of Great Moravia, conquers Lower Pannonia (today's Southwestern Hungary and Northern Croatia), during the succession strife in the East Frankish Kingdom (approximate date).
- The first historic document (written by Regino of Prüm) mentions Duisburg.

==== Arabian Empire ====
- The Zanj Rebellion: Abbasid general Al-Muwaffaq brings in Egyptian forces, to help him in his two-year siege of the Zanj capital Mukhtara. He captures the city, and crushes the revolt that has devastated Chaldea (modern Iraq) since 869.
- September 11 – Yazaman al-Khadim, Abbasid governor of Tarsus, routs a Byzantine army under general Kesta Styppiotes, in a night attack. According to Arab chroniclers, 70,000 out of 100,000 Byzantine troops are killed.

== Births ==
- Burchard II, duke of Swabia (or 884)
- Ibn Masarra, Muslim ascetic and scholar (d. 931)
- Zhao Jiliang, chancellor of Later Shu (d. 946)
- Zhao Tingyin, Chinese general (d. 949)

== Deaths ==
- September 11 – Kesta Styppiotes, Byzantine general
- Ansegisus, archbishop of Sens (or 879)
- Anselm of Farfa, Frankish abbot (approximate date)
- Bertharius, Benedictine abbot and poet
- Bertulf, archbishop of Trier
- Dawud al-Zahiri, Muslim scholar (or 884)
- Eochocán mac Áedo, king of Ulaid (Ireland)
- Froila, Galician bishop
- Guy II, duke of Spoleto
- Han Jian, Chinese warlord
- Ignatius II, patriarch of Antioch
- Pi Rixiu, Chinese poet
- Wang Jingchong, Chinese governor (b. 847)
- Yang Fuguang, Chinese general (b. 842)
