= Campaign of Melitene (882) =

- Part of the Arab–Byzantine wars
- Map of the Arab-Byzantine frontier zone. The route taken by Basil during his 882 campaign can bee seen
Date	Spring 882
Location	Malatya, Turkey
Result	Abbasid victory

Belligerents
Byzantine Empire	Abbasid Caliphate: Emirate of Melitene; Emirate of Marash; Emirate of Hadath

Commanders and leaders
Basil the Macedonian	Unknown

Strength
Unknown	Unknown

Casualties and losses
Unknown	Unknown

The Melitene campaign was launched by the Byzantine emperor Basil the Macedonian against the Emirate of Melitene in the year 882. The main objective of the campaign was to capture Melitene, a powerful Arab fortress. The attempted siege of Melitene was repelled and compelled the emperor to retreat.

== Background ==
In the year 879, the Byzantine emperor Basil the Macedonian launched a new campaign against the Arabs and the Paulicians on the frontier and achieved many victories. However, by the end of the year, his eldest son Constantine has passed away. This, alongside the fall of Syracuse to the Arabs in 878, devastated Basil's spirit, and for two years after his 879 campaign in the East, the emperor, perhaps disappointed at not having been able to capture the strongholds of Marash and Hadath and undoubtedly also overwhelmed by the death of his beloved son Constantine, did not undertake any further expeditions to the East.

In the year 880, Basil dispatched his naval commander Nasar to deal with Arab attacks on the western coast of Greece. The Byzantine navy scored a victory against the Arabs at the Battle of Cephalonia, which nearly destroyed and captured Arab ships. Afterwards, the Byzantine sailed towards Reggio Calabria. There they landed and drove the Arabs out of several towns from Calabria. Learning of Nasar's victories, Basil was encouraged to launch another attack against the Arabs, this time targeting Melitene. Despite earlier successes, Melitene, Samosata, Hadath, Marash, and Tarsus were still in Arab hands. Basil prepared a campaign against Melitene with the objective of capturing this fortress and then using it as a base for the elimination of the other fortresses.

== Campaign ==
In spring of 882, Basil marched into Anatolia towards Melitene. Basil left the capital and traveled to Caesareia via the military road, where he met up with his thematic forces. From this point on, he may have followed the road across the plains to Arasaxa, crossed the Zamantı River to Larissa and Herpa, and then continued on the aforementioned stream to Tzamandos. After that, he traveled east over the hills to Gürün and then to Melitene via Taraton. The Arabs of Melitene anticipated an attack and prepared themselves well. They were also assisted by their neighboring cities Marash and Hadath. While Basil was besieging Melitene, the city was relieved by troops from two aforementioned cities. The Arabs drove the Byzantines and forced them into hasty retreat. The Arabs chased the Byzantines up to a locality called Sirica, on the Upper Saros River, northwest of Arabissus.

== Aftermath ==
This campaign was the last in which the emperor took personal command. In the years afterward, he entrusted all duties to others.

The following season, the Arabs understood the seriousness of their situation and aimed to escape the tightening grip the Byzantines were imposing each year. In 882, Ibn Tulun dispatched his subordinate, Halaf al-Fargani, along with troops from the Syrian borderlands, to strike Byzantine lands. With Byzantine attention once again focused on Western matters, the Arabs delivered a decisive defeat, killing 10,000 Byzantines, and returned with spoils amounting to forty dinars per soldier.

== Sources ==
- Norman Tobias (1969), Basil I (867-886), the Founder of the Macedonian Dynasty: A Study of the Political and Military History of the Byzantine Empire in the Ninth Century.
- Alexander Vasiliev (1968), Byzantium and the Arabs, Vol. 2: Political relations between Byzantines and Arabs during the Macedonian Dynasty (In French).
- Warren Treadgold (1997), A History of the Byzantine State and Society.
- Philip M. Fields (1987), The History of al-Ṭabarī, Volume XXXVII: The ʿAbbāsid Recovery: The War Against the Zanj Ends, A.D. 879–893/A.H. 266–279.
