= Battle of Chrysoboullon (883) =

Abbasid victory over the Byzantines in Cilicia

- Part of the Arab–Byzantine wars
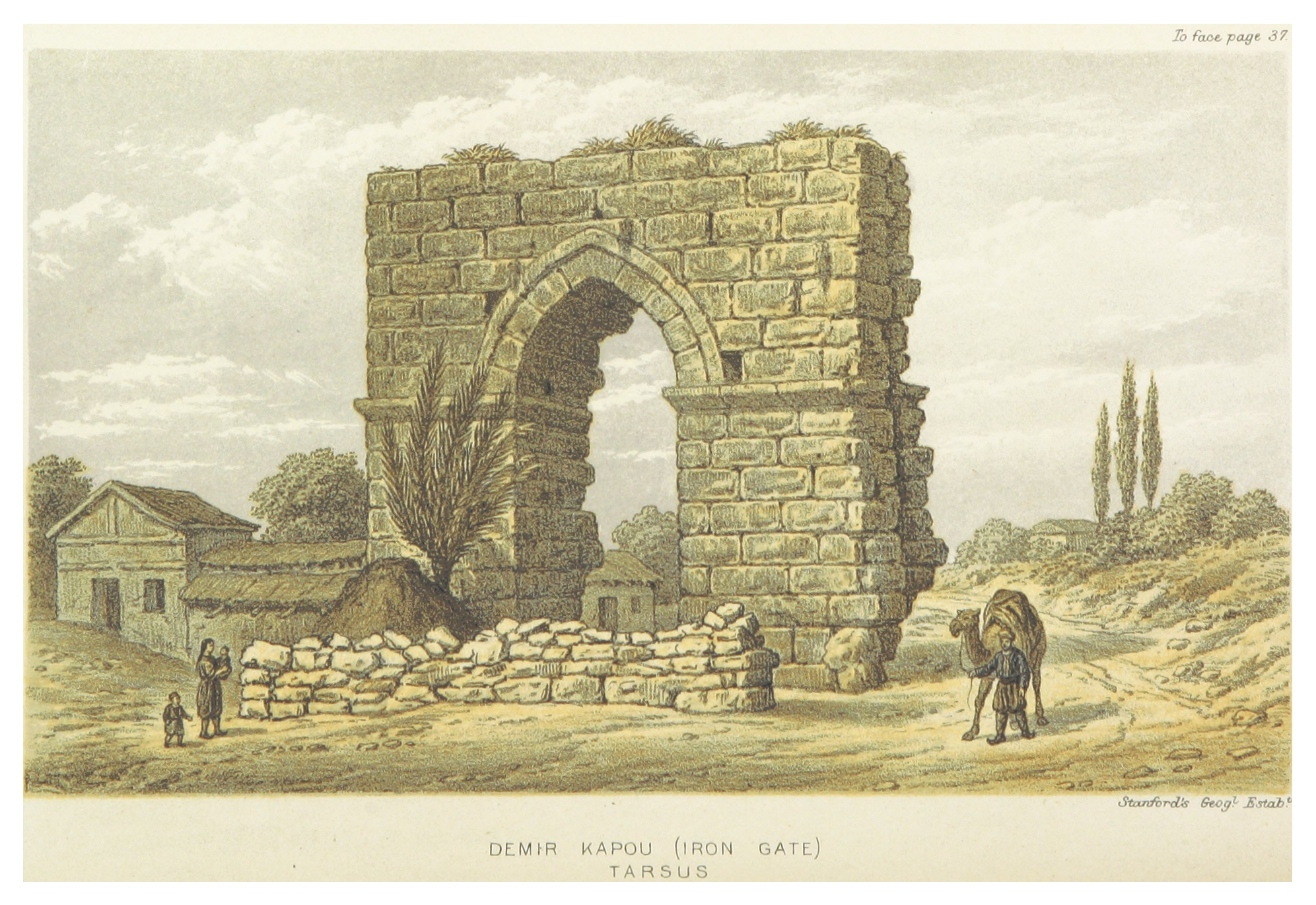
- The Demir Kapi (Iron Gate), one of the gates lining Tarsus' fortifications
| Date | 14 September 883 |
| Location | Tarsus, Cilicia, modern day Turkey |
| Result | Abbasid victory |

Belligerents
| Byzantine Empire | Abbasid Caliphate: Emirate of Tarsus |

Commanders and leaders
| Kesta Styppiotes † | Yazaman al-Khadim |

Strength
| 100,000 according to Al-Tabari (exaggerated) | Fewer than the Byzantines |

Casualties and losses
| 7,000 according to Al-Tabari; 70,000 according to Sibt ibn al-Jawzi (exaggerated); 2 strategoi | Minimal |

The Battle of Chrysoboullon or Battle of Bab Qalamyah was fought between the Byzantine Empire and troops of Abbasid Tarsus in 883, during a Byzantine offensive into Cilicia. With a well-timed stratagem, the governor of Tarsus, Yazaman al-Khadim conducted a surprise attack on the Byzantine army and inflicted a defeat on them, checking their ambitions to capture Tarsus.

== Background ==
In the years of Basil I's reign, the Emirate of Tarsus had suffered a series of defeats by the Byzantines, under the command of Domestikos Andrew the Scythian, culminating in a disaster at Podandus in 878, where the Abbasid governor of Tarsus, Abdallah ibn Rashid ibn Kawus was captured, and his army was annihilated by the Byzantines. In the following years, Cilicia became embroiled in the wider crisis between the Abbasids and Tulunids. In 882, a revolt by the people of Tarsus against Khalaf al-Farghani, the governor of Cilicia appointed by Ahmad ibn Tulun, freed Yazaman al-Khadim (who had been arrested by the Tulunids) and appointed him as their leader to realign Tarsus with the Abbasids. The inhabitants of Tarsus then foiled an attempt by Ibn Tulun to reconquer the province.

In the meantime, Andrew the Scythian had been dismissed as Domestikos due to his alleged role in the conspiracy of Basil's son Leo against the Emperor. His replacement was Kesta Styppiotes, a man John Skylitzes scorns as highly inept in the position. Seeking to exploit the successes achieved against the Abbasids and border Emirates in the previous year, Basil appointed Styppiotes to lead a major expedition against Tarsus. His army included troops from the Anatolikon and Cappadocian themes.

== Surprise attack at Chrysoboullon ==
Arriving in Cilicia, Kesta rested his army at a place called Chrysoboullon, 12km from Tarsus, for the night of 14 September. However, he neglected to conduct the usual precautions of fortifying his encampment, as was expected under Byzantine doctrine. When intelligence arrived at Tarsus of this negligent state of the Byzantine army, Al-Khadim led his troops out of the city on a discreet night march towards the Byzantines.

As Tarsus' forces were outnumbered following their previous defeats during Andrew's campaigns, they were hesitant to engage the Byzantines directly, and thus Al-Khadim resorted to a stratagem. According to John Skylitzes, he gathered many horses, positioning them on several sides of the Byzantine camp, and attached dried pelts to each of their tails. When the signal was given, these pelts were set on fire and the Arabs released the panicked animals towards the camp.This stampede of the horses caused great confusion and chaos among the Byzantine soldiers, most of whom were asleep. To increase the effect of his stratagem, Al-Khadim ordered his troops to raise a loud cacophony with trumpets and drums. Finally, the Arabs launched an assault on the Byzantines, with their troops following behind the horses. The Byzantine troops, unable to arm themselves and having lost cohesion, could not offer effective resistance to the Arabs and were cut down in great numbers. The Byzantines suffered further losses when, in a desperate bid to escape, large numbers of men were trampled by their fleeing comrades.

The ultimate losses of the Byzantines were grievous, with Kesta Styppiotes and the strategoi of Cappadocia and Anatolikon being among the fallen. However, the figure of 70,000 provided by the 13th-century Arab chronicler Sibt ibn al-Jawzi from a total of 100,000 men being killed in battle are grossly inflated. Al-Tabari records a far more modest figure of 7,000 casualties incurred by the Byzantines. Another leader, the commander of Koron fortress, managed to escape despite sustaining severe injuries in the battle. According to Al-Tabari, the Arabs also took enormous quantities of booty from the Byzantine camp, including seven crosses of gold and silver, numerous decorated swords and other weapons, along with 15,000 horses and mules.

== Aftermath ==
The battle was the last major expedition in the east during Basil I's reign, and resulted in the prompt restoration of Andrew the Scythian as Domestikos of the East. A prisoner exchange was negotiated between Tarsus and Byzantium in 884. The great victory in 883 cemented Yazaman al-Khadim's position as Emir of Tarsus. In the following years, Al-Khadim became infamous for conducting naval raids against Byzantine possessions along the Eastern Mediterranean, including the unsuccessful Siege of Euripos. He continued these attacks until his death in 891, after being mortally wounded in a failed attack on the Byzantine fortress of Salandu.

== Bibliography ==
- Treadgold, Warren (1997). A History of the Byzantine State and Society. Stanford, California: Stanford University Press. ISBN 978-0804779371.
- Wortley, John, ed. (2010). John Skylitzes: A Synopsis of Byzantine History, 811–1057. Cambridge: Cambridge University Press. ISBN 978-0-521-76705-7.
- Fields, Philip M., ed. (1987). The History of al-Ṭabarī, Volume XXXVII: The ʿAbbāsid Recovery: The War Against the Zanj Ends, A.D. 879–893/A.H. 266–279. SUNY Series in Near Eastern Studies. Albany, New York: State University of New York Press. ISBN 978-0-88706-054-0.
- Pryor, John H.; Jeffreys, Elizabeth M. (2006). The Age of the ΔΡΟΜΩΝ: The Byzantine Navy ca. 500–1204. Leiden and Boston: Brill Academic Publishers. ISBN 978-90-04-15197-0.
- Vasiliev, A. A. (1968). Byzance et les Arabes, Tome II, 1ére partie: Les relations politiques de Byzance et des Arabes à L'époque de la dynastie macédonienne (867–959) (in French). French ed.: Henri Grégoire, Marius Canard. Brussels: Éditions de l'Institut de Philologie et d'Histoire Orientales.
- Tobias, Norman (2007). Basil I, Founder of the Macedonian Dynasty: A Study of the Political and Military History of the Byzantine Empire in the Ninth Century. ISBN 978-0773454057.
