= Urkhuz ibn Ulugh Tarkhan =

Urkhuz ibn Ulugh Tarkhan or ibn Yulugh was a Turkish general of the Abbasid Caliphate and governor of Tarsus and of the borderlands with the Byzantine Empire in Cilicia (al-thughur al-Shamiya) in the years 873/4–878.

Of Turkic origin, as his patronymic attests, Urkhuz was appointed governor of the borderlands with his seat at Tarsus in the year AH 260 (October 873 – October 874). Ibn Sa'id reports that he mishandled the local populace. In addition, he neglected to adequately provision the crucial border fortress of Loulon, causing its garrison to threaten to surrender it to the Byzantines. Thereupon the Tarsians gathered 5,000 gold dinars for the garrison, but Urkhuz embezzled the money by pretending to deliver it in person to Loulon. As a result, Loulon was handed over to the Byzantine emperor Basil I the Macedonian (c. 876).

As a result, Urkhuz was dismissed from his governorship, and was posted to a border fortress near Adana. In late December 878, however, a Byzantine army, 30,000 strong according to al-Tabari, invaded the area. Urkhuz and 400 of his men were taken prisoner, while 1,400 Muslims fell in battle. The Byzantines departed after four days, on 2 January 879. His successor as governor, Abdallah ibn Rashid ibn Kawus, had in the meantime also been captured by the Byzantines.

== Sources ==
- Lilie, Ralph-Johannes; Ludwig, Claudia; Pratsch, Thomas; Zielke, Beate (2013). Prosopographie der mittelbyzantinischen Zeit Online. Berlin-Brandenburgische Akademie der Wissenschaften. Nach Vorarbeiten F. Winkelmanns erstellt (in German). Berlin and Boston: De Gruyter.
- Stern, S. M. (1960). "The Coins of Thamal and of Other Governors of Tarsus". Journal of the American Oriental Society. 80 (3): 217–225. doi:10.2307/596170. JSTOR 596170.
- Toynbee, Arnold (1973). Constantine Porphyrogenitus and His World. Oxford University Press. ISBN 0-19-215253-X.
- Waines, David, ed. (1992). The History of al-Ṭabarī, Volume XXXVI: The Revolt of the Zanj, A.D. 869–879/A.H. 255–265. SUNY Series in Near Eastern Studies. Albany, New York: State University of New York Press. ISBN 978-0-7914-0763-9.

Preceded by Muhammad ibn Ali al-Armani	Governor of Tarsus; 873/4 – ca. 876	Succeeded by Abdallah ibn Rashid ibn Kawus
