= Muhammad ibn Ali al-Armani =

Military commander of the Abbasid Caliphate

Muhammad ibn Ali al-Armani (Arabic: محمد بن علي الأرمني) was the son of the Abbasid military commander Ali al-Armani ("Ali the Armenian"), who was celebrated for leading several campaigns against the Byzantine Empire during his tenure as governor of Tarsus, from ca. 852/3 to 862. Muhammad himself was appointed to the same post in 872, after the nominated governor Muhammad ibn Harun al-Taghlibi died before taking up the post. He held it until he was killed by the Byzantines in 873.

== Sources ==
- Stern, S. M. (1960). "The Coins of Thamal and of Other Governors of Tarsus". Journal of the American Oriental Society. 80 (3): 217–225. doi:10.2307/596170. JSTOR 596170.

Preceded by Muhammad ibn Harun al-Taghlibi	Governor of Tarsus; 872–873	Succeeded by Urkhuz ibn Ulugh Tarkhan
