= Abdallah ibn Rashid ibn Kawus =

- عبدالله بن راشد بن كيوس

Governor of Tarsus and Cilician borderlands
- In office ca. 878 – ca.878

Military service
- Allegiance: Abbasid Caliphate
- Commands: 4,000 men
- Battles/wars: Arab-Byzantine Wars; Raids against Byzantine; Battle of Podandus (WIA) (POW)

Abdallah ibn Rashid ibn Kawus (Arabic: عبدالله بن راشد بن كيوس) was the Abbasid governor of Tarsus and the Cilician borderlands (ath-thughur ash-Shamiya) between the Abbasid Caliphate and the Byzantine Empire in ca. 878.

In summer 878, he led 4,000 men in one of the customary raids (ṣā'ifa) against the Byzantine frontier provinces. He first marched against the forts of al-Hasin and al-Maskanin, taking much booty. As he turned back, however, he was encircled at the Battle of Podandus by the assembled forces of the Byzantine commands of Seleucia, Pisidia, Qurra (Koron), Kawkab (unidentified) and Harshana (Charsianon). The ensuing battle was a disaster for the Muslims, only 500 or 600 of whom survived it; Abdallah himself was heavily wounded and taken prisoner to Emperor Basil I the Macedonian in Constantinople. This battle is probably to be equated with the defeat of the unnamed "Emir of Tarsus" by the Domestic of the Schools Andrew the Scythian mentioned for about the same period by the Byzantine sources.

At about the time of Abdallah's capture, control over the Cilician marches, as with the rest of Syria, passed from the Abbasid central government to the ambitious autonomous ruler of Egypt, Ahmad ibn Tulun, who appointed a certain Takhshi to succeed Abdallah. In the next year, Emperor Basil sent Abdallah as a gift, alongside other Muslim prisoners and several captured copies of the Quran to Ahmad ibn Tulun.

Preceded by Urkhuz ibn Ulugh Tarkhan	Governor of Tarsus ca. 878	Succeeded by Takhshi
