= 884 =

Calendar year

884 in various calendars
- Gregorian calendar: 884; DCCCLXXXIV
- Ab urbe condita: 1637
- Armenian calendar: 333; ԹՎ ՅԼԳ
- Assyrian calendar: 5634
- Balinese saka calendar: 805–806
- Bengali calendar: 290–291
- Berber calendar: 1834
- Buddhist calendar: 1428
- Burmese calendar: 246
- Byzantine calendar: 6392–6393
- Chinese calendar: 癸卯年 (Water Rabbit); 3581 or 3374 — to — 甲辰年 (Wood Dragon); 3582 or 3375
- Coptic calendar: 600–601
- Discordian calendar: 2050
- Ethiopian calendar: 876–877
- Hebrew calendar: 4644–4645
- Hindu calendars
- Vikram Samvat: 940–941
- Shaka Samvat: 805–806
- Kali Yuga: 3984–3985
- Holocene calendar: 10884
- Iranian calendar: 262–263
- Islamic calendar: 270–271
- Japanese calendar: Gangyō 8 (元慶８年)
- Javanese calendar: 782–783
- Julian calendar: 884; DCCCLXXXIV
- Korean calendar: 3217
- Minguo calendar: 1028 before ROC 民前1028年
- Nanakshahi calendar: −584
- Seleucid era: 1195/1196 AG
- Thai solar calendar: 1426–1427
- Tibetan calendar: ཆུ་མོ་ཡོས་ལོ་ (female Water-Hare); 1010 or 629 or −143 — to — ཤིང་ཕོ་འབྲུག་ལོ་ (male Wood-Dragon); 1011 or 630 or −142

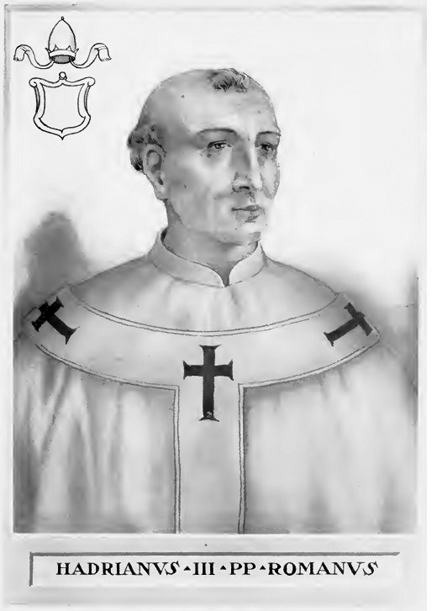
Pope Adrian III (or Hadrian III)

Year 884 (DCCCLXXXIV) was a leap year starting on Wednesday of the Julian calendar.

== Events ==
=== By place ===
==== Europe ====
- March 1 – Diego Rodríguez Porcelos, count of Castile, founds and repopulates (repoblación) Burgos and Ubierna (Northern Spain), under the mandate of King Alfonso III of Asturias.
- Summer – King Carloman II reverts to the former fall-back of 'pay and pray', buying (with Danegeld) a truce at Amiens, while he raises 12,000 lbs of silver for the Vikings to depart.
- December 12 – Carloman II dies after a hunting accident. He is succeeded by his cousin, Emperor Charles the Fat, who for the last time reunites the Frankish Empire.

==== Britain ====
- King Æthelred II of Mercia marries Princess Æthelflæd, daughter of King Alfred the Great. He accepts Wessex overlordship, and demotes himself to become "Lord of the Mercians".

==== Arabian Empire ====
- January 6 – Hasan ibn Zayd, founder of the Zaydid Dynasty, dies after a 20-year reign at Amul. He is succeeded by his brother Muhammad, as emir of Tabaristan.
- May 10 – Ahmad ibn Tulun, founder of the Tulunid Dynasty, dies after a 15-year reign. He is succeeded by his son Khumarawayh, as ruler of Egypt and Syria.
- Fall – The Arabs sack the abbey of Monte Cassino in two raids (September and November). The bulk of the monastic community flee to Teano (Campania).

==== Asia ====
- March 4 – Emperor Yōzei is forced to abdicate the throne by Fujiwara no Mototsune, chancellor (kampaku) of the Japanese royal court. He is succeeded by his great-uncle Kōkō.
- The Huang Chao rebellion is suppressed by forces of Emperor Xi Zong, with the help of the Shatuo Turks. Chinese warlords rule the country, instead of the imperial government.

=== By topic ===
==== Religion ====
- May 15 – Pope Marinus I dies at Rome, after a reign of less than 1½ years. He is succeeded by Adrian III (also referred to as Hadrian III), as the 109th pope of the Catholic Church.

== Births ==
- Burchard II, duke of Swabia (or 883)
- Kong Xun, Chinese general and governor (d. 931)
- Zhang Yanhan, Chinese official and chancellor (d. 941)

== Deaths ==
- January 6 – Hasan ibn Zayd, Muslim emir of Tabaristan
- May 10 – Ahmad ibn Tulun, Governor of Egypt and founder of the Tulunid dynasty (b. 835)
- May 15 – Marinus I, pope of the Catholic Church
- June 11 – Shi Jingsi, general of the Tang Dynasty
- June 29 – Yang Shili, general of the Tang Dynasty
- July 13 – Huang Chao, Chinese rebel leader (b. 835)
- September – Buran bint al-Hasan ibn Sahl, Abbasid consort (b. 807)
- October 12 – Tsunesada, Japanese prince (b. 825)
- December 12 – Carloman II, king of the West Frankish Kingdom
- Al-Abbas ibn Ahmad ibn Tulun, Tulunid prince and usurper
- Colcu mac Connacan, Irish abbot and historian
- Dawud al-Zahiri, Muslim scholar (or 883)
- Empress Cao (Huang Chao's wife)
- Domnall mac Muirecáin, king of Leinster
- Li Changyan, Chinese warlord and governor
- Shang Rang, Chinese rebel leader (approximate date)
- Wang Duo, chancellor of the Tang Dynasty
- Zhou Ji, Chinese warlord (approximate date)

== Sources ==
- Martínez Díez, Gonzalo (2005). El Condado de Castilla (711-1038). La historia frente a la leyenda (in Spanish). Valladolid: Junta de Castilla y León. ISBN 84-9718-275-8.
