= John Hagiopolites =

Byzantine soldier

John Hagiopolites (Greek: Ἰωάννης Ἁγιοπολίτης) was a senior Byzantine official in the late 9th century.

Hagiopolites is first mentioned in 886, as the "magistros and former logothetes tou dromou". It appears that he held the latter office some time during the reign of Basil I the Macedonian (r. 867–886), but it is unknown when. The Byzantine chroniclers describe him as learned and very wise.

He played a major role in the deposition of the Patriarch Photios soon after the accession of Basil I's son Leo VI the Wise (r. 886–912) to the throne. Along with the commander-in-chief Andrew the Scythian, he went to the Hagia Sophia, read the charges brought against Photios from the pulpit, and arrested the patriarch, bringing him to the Harmonianon Monastery, where he was confined pending his trial. Hagiopolites also participated as a judge in the trial for treason against Photios' confidant Theodore Santabarenos, in which Photios too was implicated, but his role during it is unknown.

A letter to him by Photios, written in September or October 886, survives, where he accuses Hagiopolites of having turned from being a student and friend, to a traitor and executioner. On the basis of this letter, Hagiopolites has been identified with another John, protospatharios, patrikios, and logothetes tou dromou, who participated in the first five sessions of the Council of 869/70 that anathematized Photios, as the representative of the Byzantine Senate. The same person is very likely the patrikios John addressed by Pope John VIII in 879, on the occasion of another Church council that reversed the previous and restored Photios.

== Sources ==
- Lilie, Ralph-Johannes; Ludwig, Claudia; Pratsch, Thomas; Zielke, Beate (2013). Prosopographie der mittelbyzantinischen Zeit Online. Berlin-Brandenburgische Akademie der Wissenschaften. Nach Vorarbeiten F. Winkelmanns erstellt (in German). Berlin and Boston: De Gruyter.
- Tougher, Shaun (1997). The Reign of Leo VI (886-912): Politics and People. Leiden and New York: BRILL. ISBN 978-90-04-10811-0.
