= Siege of Euripos =

Arab-Byzantine Conflicts

- Part of the Arab–Byzantine wars
- Map of the Arab–Byzantine naval conflict in the Mediterranean, 7th–11th centuries
Date	Shortly after 883
Location	Euripos (Chalcis, Central Greece)
Result	Byzantine victory

Belligerents
Byzantine Empire	Abbasid Caliphate (Tarsos)

Commanders and leaders
Oineiates	Yazaman al-Khadim

Strength
Unknown	30 koumbaria ships

Casualties and losses
Unknown	Heavy

The siege of Euripos (modern Chalcis) occurred in the mid-880s, when an Abbasid fleet, led by the emir of Tarsos, Yazaman al-Khadim, laid siege to the city. The local Byzantine commander, Oiniates, successfully defended the city and destroyed a large part of the besieging force.

== Background ==
In the 820s, two events, the beginning of the Muslim conquest of Sicily and the establishment of the Emirate of Crete, altered the balance of power between the Byzantine Empire and the Arabs in the Mediterranean. The former soon led to the establishment of Muslim bases on the Italian Peninsula, while the loss of Crete was particularly important, as it opened the Aegean Sea to constant Muslim raiding. Apart from the raids of the Cretan Saracens, the Abbasid caliphs also took care to strengthen their forces in the Cilician frontier districts, and Tarsos became a major base for land and seaborne attacks against Byzantine territory. This was especially the case during the tenure of Yazaman al-Khadim as governor of Tarsos in 882–891.

== Siege ==
Shortly after defeating a major Byzantine attack against him in 883, Yazaman assembled his forces for a major raid against the Byzantine provinces of Greece. According to the 11th-century Byzantine historian John Skylitzes, Yazaman's fleet comprised thirty koumbaria (large warships designed for war as well as freight), and launched an attack on the city of Euripos (the Byzantine name for Chalcis, located on the Euripus Strait between continental Central Greece and the island of Euboea). Emperor Basil I the Macedonian had received intelligence of Yazaman's intentions, however, and the governor of the local Theme of Hellas, a certain Oineiates, was well prepared to meet the attack, having assembled the troops of his province, repaired the walls and installed stone-throwing catapults on them.

Skylitzes reports that the Tarsians launched successive attacks on the city, but they were repelled by the defenders "with their machines for hurling stones, missiles and darts—to say nothing of stones thrown from the walls by hand", as well as by sorties of their own ships, equipped with Greek fire, which sunk several Arab vessels. At long last, Yazaman placed a great shield before the lines of his troops, filled it with gold and promised to award it along with a hundred maidens to the first of his men who scaled the wall. When the besieged saw this, they understood that the final attack was imminent, and so, shouting to encourage each other, they launched a sortie of their own. The attack was successful, killing many of the besiegers and putting the rest to flight.

Skylitzes reports that Yazaman too fell "at the first encounter", but this is clearly an error or a confusion, as al-Tabari records that he launched further raids against Byzantium in 886 and in 888, and was killed in 891 during his siege of the Byzantine fortress of Salandu.

== Aftermath ==
Despite this Byzantine success, the Saracen raids continued unabated, and reached their climax in the early 10th century with the activities of Leo of Tripoli and Damian of Tarsus, culminating in the Sack of Thessalonica, the Byzantine Empire's second city, in 904. It was only after the 920s that the Byzantines began taking the upper hand, ending in the recovery of Crete, Cyprus, and finally Cilicia, in the 960s under Nikephoros Phokas.

== Sources ==
- Fields, Philip M., ed. (1987). The History of al-Ṭabarī, Volume XXXVII: The ʿAbbāsid Recovery: The War Against the Zanj Ends, A.D. 879–893/A.H. 266–279. SUNY Series in Near Eastern Studies. Albany, New York: State University of New York Press. ISBN 978-0-88706-054-0.
- Pryor, John H.; Jeffreys, Elizabeth M. (2006). The Age of the ΔΡΟΜΩΝ: The Byzantine Navy ca. 500–1204. Leiden and Boston: Brill Academic Publishers. ISBN 978-90-04-15197-0.
- Wortley, John, ed. (2010). John Skylitzes: A Synopsis of Byzantine History, 811–1057. Cambridge: Cambridge University Press. ISBN 978-0-521-76705-7.
