= Arasaxa =

Town of ancient Cappadocia

Coordinates: 38°37′06″N 35°52′33″E

Arasaxa, also known as Arathia and Arassaxa, was a town of ancient Cappadocia, inhabited during Roman and Byzantine times. It may be this Arathia which was a bishopric in antiquity (see Arathia).

Its site is located near Akmescit, Asiatic Turkey.
