= Koron (Cappadocia) =

Town of ancient Cappadocia

Coordinates: 38°04′04″N 34°19′02″E

Koron was a town of ancient Cappadocia, inhabited in Byzantine times.

Its site is located near Çömlekçi, Altunhisar district, Asiatic Turkey.
