= Christopher (Domestic of the Schools) =

Christopher (Greek: Χριστόφορος, fl. 870s) was the commander-in-chief (Domestic of the Schools) of the Byzantine army during the 870s, and scored significant victories against the Paulicians.

== Biography ==
Nothing is known of Christopher's origin, date of birth or death. He is identified in the sources as the gambros of Emperor Basil I the Macedonian (r. 867–886), a word which usually means "son-in-law", but can imply a more general family tie through marriage. Cyril Mango suggested that Christopher married Basil's eldest daughter, Anastasia, but all the emperor's daughters were eventually confined to a convent.

In 872 or 878/9, Christopher led an expedition against the Paulicians of Tephrike, comprising the forces of the Charsianon and Armeniakon themes. The campaign culminated in the Battle of Bathys Ryax, which saw a crushing defeat of the Paulicians and the death of their leader, Chrysocheir. This success was followed, whether immediately afterwards or a few years later, by the sack of the Paulician capital, Tephrike, and the extinction of their state.

== Sources ==
- Guilland, Rodolphe (1967). "Le Domestique des Scholes". Recherches sur les institutions byzantines [Studies on the Byzantine Institutions]. Berliner byzantinische Arbeiten 35 (in French). Vol. I. Berlin and Amsterdam: Akademie-Verlag & Adolf M. Hakkert. pp. 426–468. OCLC 878894516.
- Kazhdan, Alexander (1991). "Christopher". In Kazhdan, Alexander (ed.). The Oxford Dictionary of Byzantium. Oxford and New York: Oxford University Press. pp. 441–442. ISBN 0-19-504652-8.
- Kiapidou, Eirini-Sofia (17 January 2003). "Battle at Bathys Ryax, 872/8". Encyclopedia of the Hellenic World, Asia Minor. Athens: Foundation of the Hellenic World. Archived from the original on 21 July 2011.

Unknown Title last held by Antigonos	Domestic of the Schools ca. 872/878	Succeeded by Andrew the Scythian
