= Andrew the Scythian =

Byzantine military officer of the 9th century

- Died: After 887
- Military career
- Allegiance: Byzantine Empire
- Service years: c. 860 – after 887
- Rank: Domestic of the Schools
- Wars: Arab–Byzantine wars: Battle of Podandus

Andrew the Scythian (Greek: Άνδρέας, died after 887) was a senior Byzantine military officer who distinguished himself in the Arab–Byzantine wars. He eventually held the post of Domestic of the Schools during the last years of the reign of Basil I the Macedonian and in the early reign of Leo VI the Wise, until his death. He played a major role in the domestic affairs of Leo's early reign, especially in the dismissal and trial of Patriarch Photios. He was of Slav origin.

== Life ==
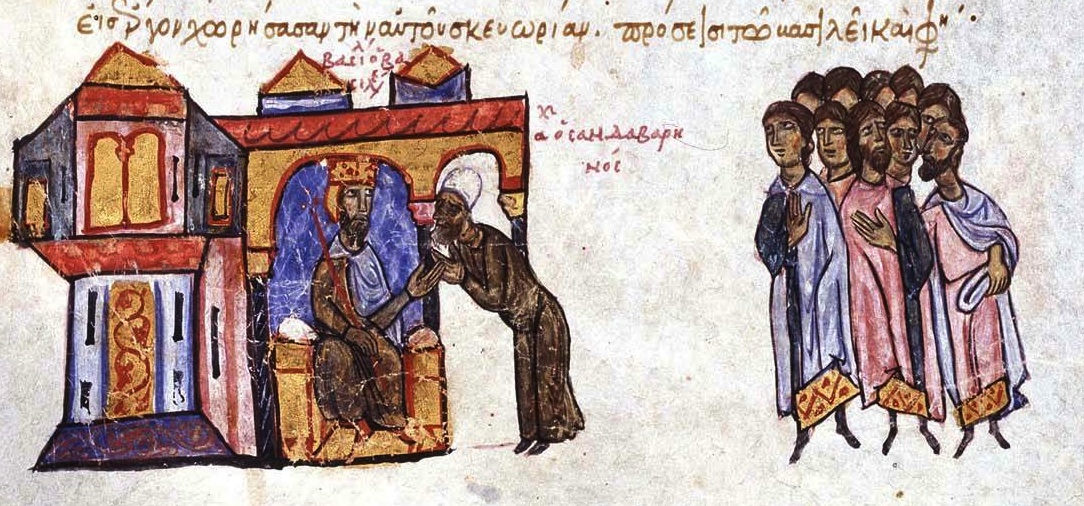
Theodore Santabarenos alerts Emperor Basil I of a knife carried by his son Leo, a conspiracy in which Andrew was allegedly implicated.

According to the chronicler Genesios and the continuators of Georgios Monachos, Andrew descended from the "western Scythians", whence the sobriquet "the Scythian" given to him by modern scholars. In reality, "Scythians" was an archaizing Byzantine term for the Slavs.

Andrew may be identifiable as the man of the same name who commanded the imperial bodyguard, the Hetaireia, when the young Basil the Macedonian (r. 867–886) served there during his swift rise from a simple stable groom to high office in the late 850s and early 860s as a protégé of Emperor Michael III (r. 842–867). When Basil came to power after assassinating Michael, Andrew too rose to higher office. In the 870s, as hypostrategos (deputy commander) of the Opsician Theme, he distinguished himself in the constant war of raids and counter-raids with the Muslim border emirates of Melitene and Tarsus, on the eastern fringes of Asia Minor. For his service, he was eventually rewarded with the titles of patrikios and the post of Domestic of the Schools (commander-in-chief).

Theophanes Continuatus reports that he was dismissed due to accusations of timidity, after failing to follow up on a decisive victory at the Battle of Podandus against the emir of Tarsus, Abdallah ibn Rashid ibn Kawus, which the Byzantine sources place in the year 878. Genesios and the continuators of Georgios Monachos on the other hand don't mention a dismissal, but simply record that on account of his victories, he was raised further to the rank of magistros. Andrew is also mentioned as leading, along with Christopher, the sacking of Tephrike, the Paulician capital, an event dated by modern scholars to 878. This is considered erroneous by modern scholars, since the final campaign against Tephrike was in all likelihood led by Emperor Basil in person. On the other hand, the chronicle of Symeon Logothetes gives an entirely different background to his dismissal, placing it in 883 and the fall-out between Basil and his son, the future Leo VI (r. 886–912). According to Symeon, Theodore Santabarenos accused Andrew of being privy to a plot of the circle around Leo to depose his father. Along with other high-ranking officials connected to the heir-apparent, Andrew lost his post, even though he was on campaign at the time. Whatever the true course of events, his disgrace did not last long, as his successor, Kesta Styppiotes, was decisively beaten by the Arabs, and Andrew soon regained his post, which he held to the end of his life.

When Leo succeeded his father, Andrew quickly emerged as the new emperor's right-hand man. Thus it was Andrew who headed the delegation of senior officials and senators sent by Leo immediately after his accession on 29 August 886 to Chrysopolis in order to retrieve and bring back to the capital for reburial in the Church of the Holy Apostles the corpse of Michael III, whom Leo believed to have been his real father. Andrew was also instrumental in the downfall of the Patriarch Photios, who along with his protégé Theodore Santabarenos was accused by Andrew and the magistros Stephen of plotting to overthrow Leo. As the emperor's trusted agent, it was Andrew who, along with the Logothete of the Course, John Hagiopolites, went to the Hagia Sophia, read the charges brought against Photios from the pulpit, and arrested the patriarch. Photios' trial for treason took place in 887, before a tribunal of senior officials presided over by Andrew. Photios and Theodore were found guilty, with the former banished to the monastery of Gordon, where he died, while Theodore was exiled to Athens.

The trial of Photios is the last mention of Andrew in the sources. He must have died sometime between then and 894, when Nikephoros Phokas the Elder is recorded as having succeeded him as Domestic of the Schools.

== Sources ==
- Guilland, Rodolphe (1967). "Le Domestique des Scholes". Recherches sur les institutions byzantines [Studies on the Byzantine Institutions]. Berliner byzantinische Arbeiten 35 (in French). Vol. I. Berlin and Amsterdam: Akademie-Verlag & Adolf M. Hakkert. pp. 426–468. OCLC 878894516.
- Lilie, Ralph-Johannes; Ludwig, Claudia; Pratsch, Thomas; Zielke, Beate (2013). Prosopographie der mittelbyzantinischen Zeit Online. Berlin-Brandenburgische Akademie der Wissenschaften. Nach Vorarbeiten F. Winkelmanns erstellt (in German). Berlin and Boston: De Gruyter.
- Tougher, Shaun (1997). The Reign of Leo VI (886-912): Politics and People. Leiden and New York: BRILL. ISBN 978-90-04-10811-0.

Preceded by Christopher	Domestic of the Schools c. 880 – 883	Succeeded by Kesta Styppiotes
Preceded by Kesta Styppiotes	Domestic of the Schools; 883 – 887/894	Succeeded by Nikephoros Phokas the Elder
