= Kesta Styppiotes =

Kesta Styppiotes or Stypeiotes (Greek: Κεστά Στυππιώτης/Στυπειώτης; died 11 September 883) was briefly the Domestic of the Schools of the Byzantine Empire in ca. 883.

His surname points to an origin in the town of Stypion (modern Štip), while his first name is evidence of a Slavic or Bulgar ethnic origin. In 883, he succeeded the disgraced Andrew the Scythian as Domestic of the Schools (commander-in-chief of the Byzantine army). Andrew's disgrace has been variously attributed to the falling out between Emperor Basil I the Macedonian and his heir Leo VI the Wise at the time, with Andrew being accused as a partisan of Leo, or to accusations of timidity against the Arabs of Tarsus and failing to exploit a victory he had won against them.

Kesta took to the field against the Arabs himself, but his negligent leadership allowed the Tarsians, under Yazaman al-Khadim, to surprise and overwhelm the Byzantine camp in a night attack. According to al-Tabari (who erroneously mentions Andrew as commander of the Byzantines) this took place on 11 September 883, and the Byzantine army was decimated: Arab chroniclers, with considerable exaggeration, report that 70,000 out of 100,000 Byzantine troops were killed, and that Kesta, along with the strategoi of the Anatolic Theme and of Cappadocia fell in the field, with the commander of Koron fortress barely being able to escape, despite his heavy injuries. Following this debacle, Andrew the Scythian was re-appointed as Domestic of the Schools.

It is probable that captives from this disaster were among the Byzantines ransomed in the prisoner exchange of February 884, while eighty years later, when Tarsus fell to the Byzantines, Emperor Nikephoros II Phokas recovered the seven gold and silver crosses taken by Yazaman.

== Sources ==
- Fields, Philip M., ed. (1987). The History of al-Ṭabarī, Volume XXXVII: The ʿAbbāsid Recovery: The War Against the Zanj Ends, A.D. 879–893/A.H. 266–279. SUNY Series in Near Eastern Studies. Albany, New York: State University of New York Press. ISBN 978-0-88706-054-0.
- Guilland, Rodolphe (1967). "Le Domestique des Scholes". Recherches sur les institutions byzantines [Studies on the Byzantine Institutions]. Berliner byzantinische Arbeiten 35 (in French). Vol. I. Berlin and Amsterdam: Akademie-Verlag & Adolf M. Hakkert. pp. 426–468. OCLC 878894516.
- Lilie, Ralph-Johannes; Ludwig, Claudia; Pratsch, Thomas; Zielke, Beate (2013). Prosopographie der mittelbyzantinischen Zeit Online. Berlin-Brandenburgische Akademie der Wissenschaften. Nach Vorarbeiten F. Winkelmanns erstellt (in German). Berlin and Boston: De Gruyter.
- Tougher, Shaun (1997). The Reign of Leo VI (886-912): Politics and People. Leiden and New York: BRILL. ISBN 978-90-04-10811-0.

Preceded by Andrew the Scythian	Domestic of the Schools; 883	Succeeded by Andrew the Scythian
