= Yazaman al-Khadim =

Yazaman or Yazman, surnamed al-Khadim ("the Slave") (died 23 October 891) was the governor of Tarsus for the Abbasids and chief military leader in the Muslim borderlands with the Byzantine Empire in Cilicia (the al-thughur al-Shamiya) from 882 to his death in 891. He is celebrated for his raids against the Byzantines.

== Life ==
Yazaman appears for the first time in September/October 882. At the time he was a servant (mawla) of al-Fath ibn Khaqan, and was attacked and imprisoned by the governor of the Cilician borderlands, Khalaf al-Farghani, who had been appointed by Ahmad ibn Tulun, the autonomous ruler of Egypt and Syria. Yazaman was freed by the local people, who then rose up and rejected Tulunid rule, appointing Yazaman as their leader instead and returning to Abbasid allegiance. Ibn Tulun then marched on Tarsus, but the inhabitants opened the sluice gates and flooded the plain around the city, forcing Ibn Tulun to return to Damascus without achieving anything.

In 883, Yazaman faced a large Byzantine army sent against Tarsus, under the command of the Domestic of the Schools, Kesta Stypeiotes. Yazaman attacked the Byzantine camp at Bab Qalamyah, some 12 km from Tarsus, during the night of 11 September, catching the Byzantines by surprise. The Byzantine forces scattered, Stypeiotes and the strategoi of Anatolikon and Cappadocia were killed, and much booty was captured. Yazaman led a major naval raid soon thereafter against the fortress of Euripos (Chalkis), comprising 30 large ships (of the type called koumbaria in Greek), but it was beaten off with great loss by the local governor of Hellas, Oineiates. The historian al-Tabari records that Yazaman also led a land raid in January/February 886 up to al-Maskanin (unidentified), and returned to Tarsus with no casualties but with much booty and captives. Probably in the summer of the same year, he also led a naval raid that captured four Byzantine ships.

Despite his earlier opposition to them, in 890 Yazaman swore allegiance to the Tulunids, under Ibn Tulun's son Khumarawayh. On 4 October 891, a Tulunid officer, Ahmad ibn Tughan al-Ujayfi, arrived at Tarsus. Together with him, Yazaman led another raid against Byzantine territories. The Muslims laid siege to the Byzantine fortress of Salandu, but on 22 October Yazaman was wounded by a stone thrown by a catapult. This caused the Muslims to break off the siege, and he died on the next day on the way back. His troops carried him to Tarsus, and buried him at the "Gate of Jihad". He was succeeded by Ahmad ibn Tughan al-Ujayfi. Tarsus remained under Tulunid control until 897, when it was recovered by the Abbasids.

Yazaman's death was a keenly felt loss for the Muslims, who considered him one of their most valiant champions, alongside Umar al-Aqta and Ali al-Armani. The Arab sources report that the mariners under his command were renowned for their boldness. According to the 10th-century account of al-Mas'udi (The Meadows of Gold, VIII, 74–75) a Greek convert to Islam reported to him that Yazaman was among the ten illustrious Muslims whose portraits were displayed in some Byzantine churches in recognition of their valour.

== Sources ==
- Pryor, John H.; Jeffreys, Elizabeth M. (2006). The Age of the ΔΡΟΜΩΝ: The Byzantine Navy ca. 500–1204. Leiden and Boston: Brill Academic Publishers. ISBN 978-90-04-15197-0.
- Fields, Philip M., ed. (1987). The History of al-Ṭabarī, Volume XXXVII: The ʿAbbāsid Recovery: The War Against the Zanj Ends, A.D. 879–893/A.H. 266–279. SUNY Series in Near Eastern Studies. Albany, New York: State University of New York Press. ISBN 978-0-88706-054-0.
- Stern, S. M. (1960). "The Coins of Thamal and of Other Governors of Tarsus". Journal of the American Oriental Society. 80 (3): 217–225. doi:10.2307/596170. JSTOR 596170.
- Vasiliev, A. A. (1968). Byzance et les Arabes, Tome II, 1ére partie: Les relations politiques de Byzance et des Arabes à L'époque de la dynastie macédonienne (867–959) (in French). French ed.: Henri Grégoire, Marius Canard. Brussels: Éditions de l'Institut de Philologie et d'Histoire Orientales.

Preceded by Khalaf al-Farghani	Governor of Tarsus after 890 for the Tulunids; October 882 – October 891	Succeeded by Ahmad ibn Tughan al-Ujayfi
