= Crown jewels =

Objects of metalwork and jewellery in the regalia of a current or former monarchy

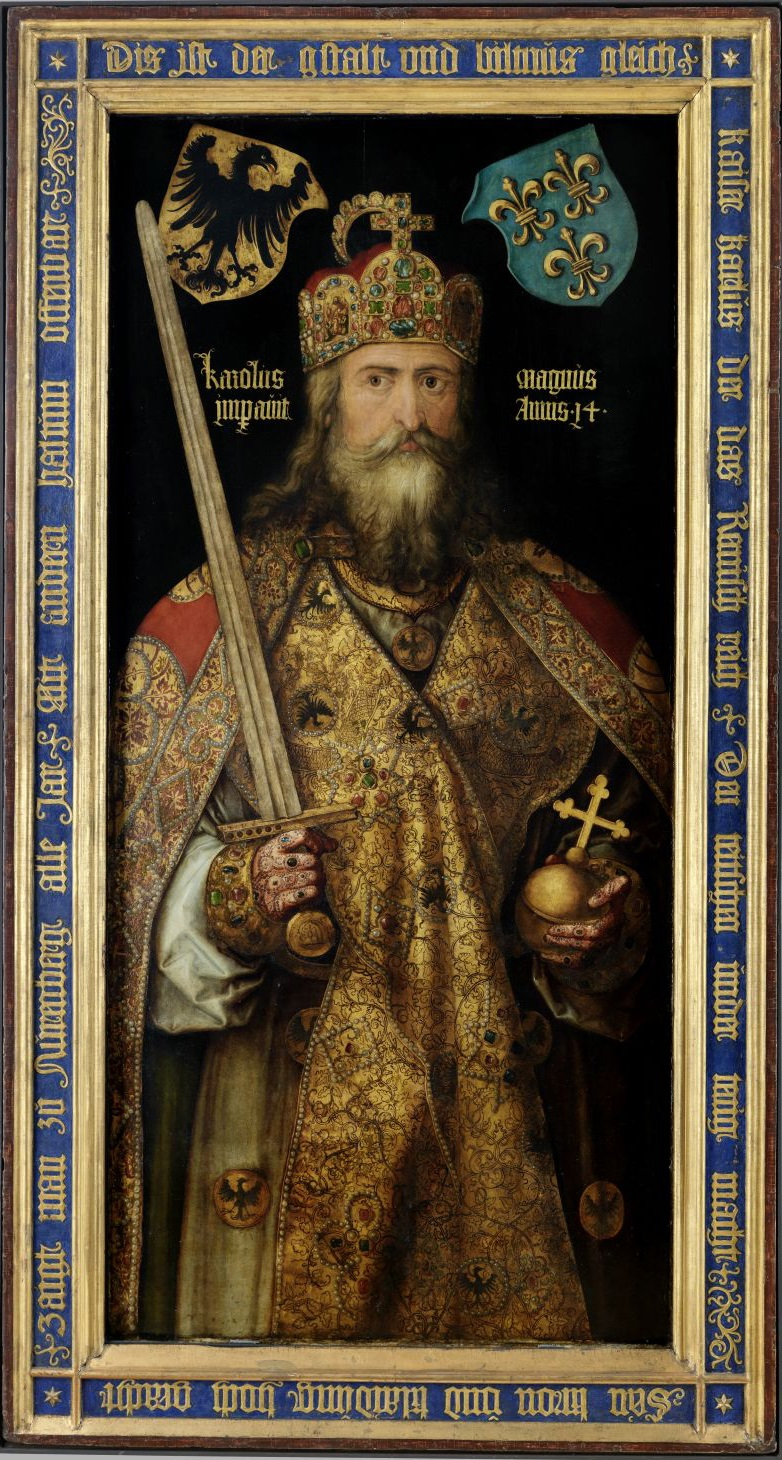
Charlemagne wearing the Imperial Regalia of the Holy Roman Empire, including the Imperial Crown, the Imperial Orb, and the Imperial Sword.

Crown jewels are the objects of metalwork and jewellery in the regalia of a current or former monarchy. They are often used for the coronation of a monarch and a few other ceremonial occasions. A monarch may often be shown wearing them in portraits, as they symbolize the power and continuity of the monarchy. Additions to them may be made, but, since medieval times, the existing items have been typically passed down unchanged, symbolizing the continuity of a monarchy.

Typical items in Europe include crowns, sceptres, orbs, swords, ceremonial maces, and rings, all usually in gold or silver-gilt and heavily decorated with precious and semi-precious gemstones, in styles which go back to the Middle Ages and are normally very conservative to emphasize the continuity of the monarchy. Many working collections of crown jewels are kept in vaults or strongrooms when not in use and can be seen by the public. The crown jewels of many former monarchies can also be seen in museums, and may still represent national cultural icons even for countries that are now republics, as for example in Hungary, where the Holy Crown of Hungary has been re-incorporated in the coat of arms of Hungary. Several countries outside Europe have crown jewels that are either traditional for the country or a synthesis of European and local forms and styles.

== Africa ==
=== Axum ===
Mostly incorporated as part of the regalia of the monarchs of the succeeding Ethiopian Empire (see below).

=== Burundi ===
The traditional emblem of the Mwami (king) was the Karyenda drum. These holy drums were kept at special drum-sanctuaries throughout the country and were brought out for special ceremonies only. One such place is in Gitega, location of the ibwami royal court.

=== Central African Republic ===
The jewels were largely provided by the emperor's political allies in France as part of that country's infamous Francafrique policy, much to the chagrin of many progressive elements both within and outside the empire. Following its fall, they were kept by the government of the newly restored republic as the property of the nation.

=== Egypt ===
- Ancient Egypt – The treasures of the Pharaohs can be seen in the Egyptian Museum in Cairo and in other museums throughout the world.
- Kingdom of Egypt – Most of the crown jewels of the Muhammad Ali dynasty are at the Museum at Abdeen Palace in Cairo.

=== Ethiopia ===
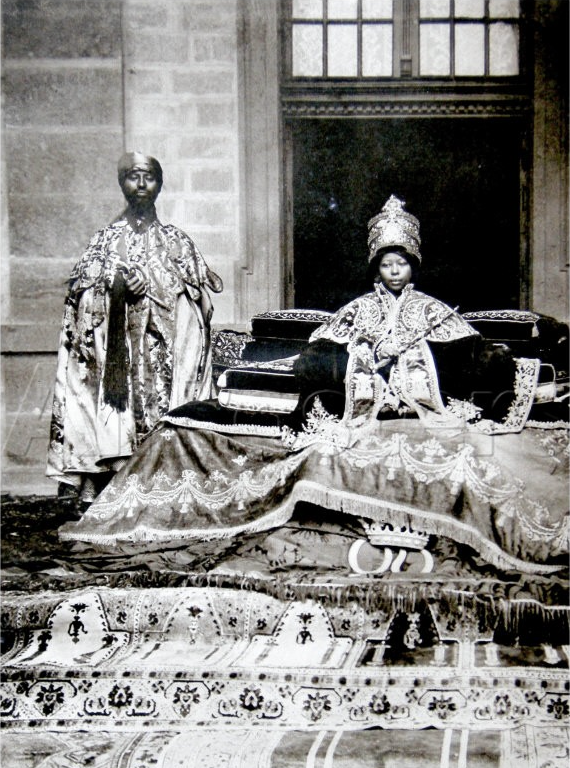
Empress Zewditu accompanied by a priest

The principal crowns worn by Ethiopian emperors and empresses regnant are unique in that they are made to be worn over a turban. They usually have the form of a cylinder of gold (although some of the crowns at the Church of Our Lady Mary of Zion in Axum have the form of a gold cube) with a convex dome on the top with usually some form of cross on a pedestal. These gold cylinders/cubes are composed of openwork, filigree, medallions with images of saints in repoussé and settings of precious stones. Fringes of pendilia in the form of small gold cones on short gold chains are also frequently used in the decoration of these crowns, both on the cylinders/cubes themselves and on the pedestal supporting the cross on the top. Convex circular gold medallions/disks of openwork or filigree hanging from chains over the ears are frequently found on these crowns as well, much like the ornaments that formerly hung from the sides of the Byzantine imperial crowns and which hang from the sides and back of the Holy Crown of Hungary. Some crowns also appear to have a semi-circular platform for additional ornaments attached to the lower front edge of the crown (on two of the crowns of Menelik II these platforms each support a small gold statuette of St. George fighting the dragon). Other parts of the Ethiopian regalia include a jewelled gold sword, a gold and ivory sceptre, a large gold orb with cross, a diamond studded ring, two gold filigreed lances of traditional Ethiopian form, and long scarlet robes heavily embroidered in gold. Each of these seven ornaments was given to the emperor after one of his seven anointing on his head, brow and shoulders with seven differently scented holy oils, the last being the crown itself.

These imperial robes consist of a number of tunics and cloaks of scarlet cloth, heavily embroidered in gold, and including an elbow-length cape with a deeply scalloped edge fringed in gold (the scallops on either side of the opening on the front being particularly long, giving them the appearance of a western priest's stole), and two large squares of scarlet cloth similarly heavily embroidered and fringed in gold attached to each shoulder. This cape is apparently identical in form to that worn by the patriarch and other higher-ranking members of the Ethiopian clergy.

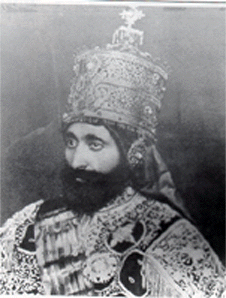
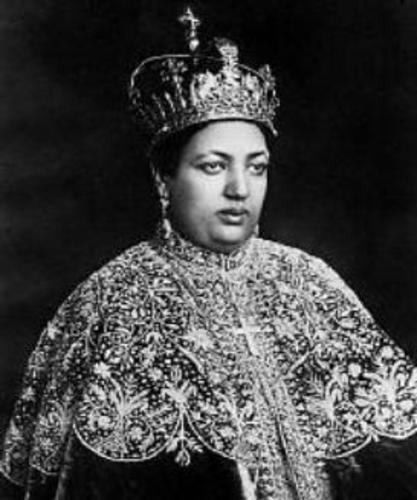
Official coronation portraits of Emperor Haile Selassie (left) and his Empress Menen Asfaw (right)

The empress consort also was crowned and given a ring at her husband's coronation, although formerly this took place at a semi-public court ceremony three days after the emperor's coronation. Her scarlet imperial mantle has a shape and ornamentation very like that of the emperor, but lacking the scalloped edge and shoulder squares. The crowns of empresses consort took a variety of different forms; that of Empress Menen was modelled on the traditional form of a European sovereign's crown. Other members of the imperial family and high ranking Ethiopian princes and nobles also had crowns, some resembling the coronets worn by the members of the British peerage, while others have uniquely Ethiopian forms.

Traditionally Ethiopian emperors were crowned at the Church of Our Lady Mary of Zion in Axum, the site of the chapel in which is kept what is believed to be the Ark of the Covenant, in order to validate the new emperor's legitimacy by reinforcing his claim to descent from Menelik I, the son of King Solomon and the Queen of Sheba, who is believed to have brought the Ark from Jerusalem to Axum. Their imperial crowns were afterwards frequently donated to the church and are kept in the church's treasury, although other monarchs have given their crowns and other regalia to various other churches. The Crown Jewels used at the coronation of Emperor Haile Selassie are kept at the museum in the National Palace (formerly the Jubilee Palace) in Addis Ababa.

=== Ghana and Cameroon ===
==== Ashanti Confederacy ====
The symbol of the power and authority of the Asantehene or sovereign ruler of the Ashanti, is the sacred Golden Stool, the Sika 'dwa. It is used for the enthronement and symbolizes the very soul of the Ashanti as a people. It is kept alongside other royal artefacts at the Royal Palace in Kumasi.

=== Madagascar ===
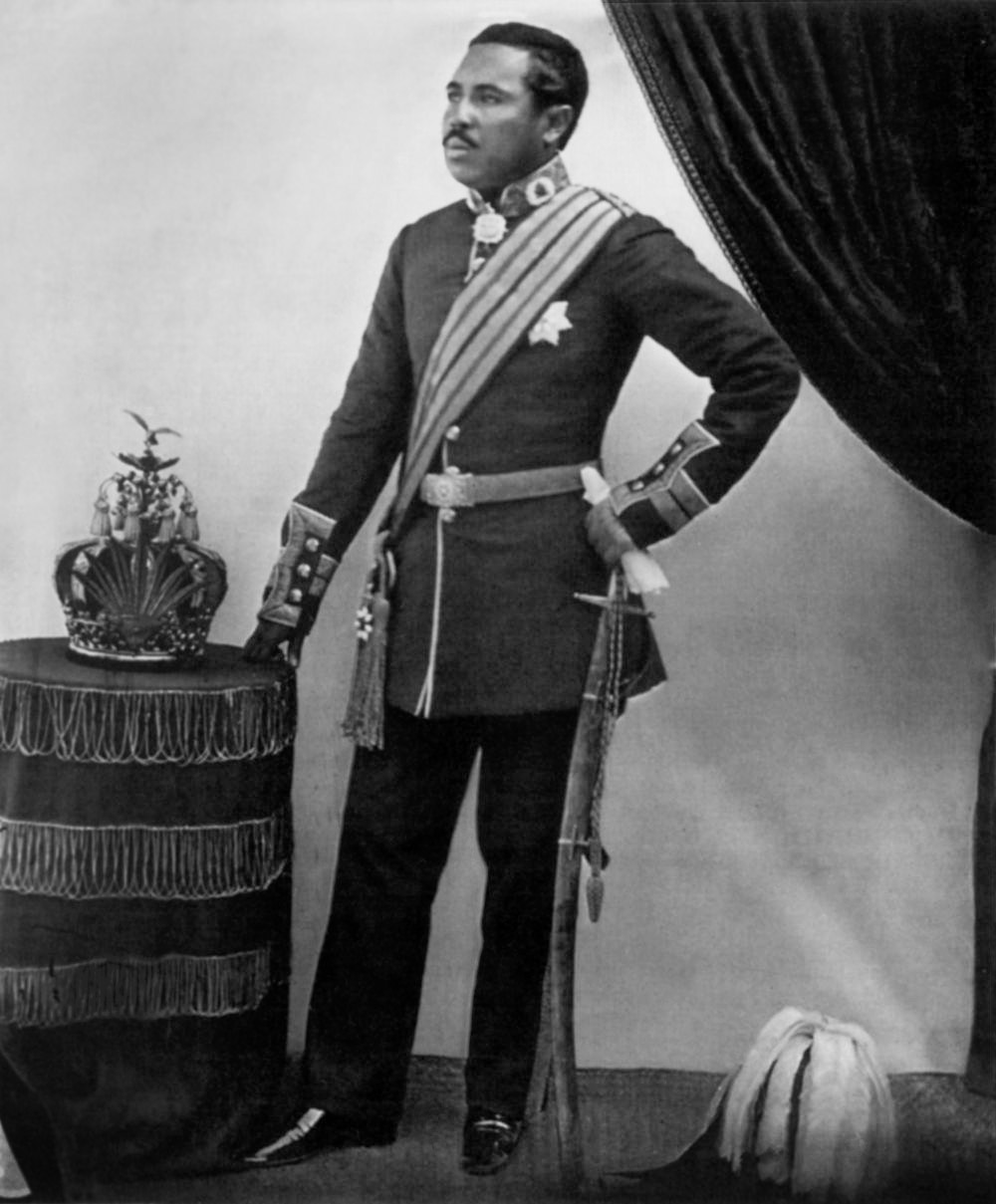
Radama II, with crown

The crown of the Malagasy sovereign was made in France for Ranavalona I. It is a large crown made from locally mined gold in c. 1890 and is very heavy. In its essential form it followed the pattern of crown associated with a sovereign in European heraldry and had four arches which intersected at the top of the crown, while the circlet was made of openwork and set with precious stones and from the circlet between the arches were triangular leaf-like ornaments which also were set with precious stones (pearls?). One of the two most distinctive features of the crown was a large fan-like ornament generally described as a representation of seven spearheads of the traditional Malagasy warrior's spear joined at the base, but in photographs and paintings it looks more like seven large feathers. The second distinctive feature is the representation of a falcon at the very top of the crown in the position a cross would occupy on the top of an orb in the traditional crown of a Christian sovereign. The falcon is a traditional symbol of the Malagasy sovereign. The inside of the crown was filled with a large red velvet cap — red being the color traditionally associated with royalty in Malagasy tradition. This crown (termed "the massive gold state crown") and many other royal artifacts were saved when the Rova of Antananarivo (the royal palace and royal tomb complex) burned on November 6, 1995, and are now kept in the Andafiavaratra Palace museum nearby. Many of the rescued items have only recently been put on display. There is a painting of Radama II standing next to the state crown, and another of Queen Ranavalona III — the last monarch — wearing it. A recent picture of the massive gold state crown as it is today in the museum can be seen here: The smaller queen's crown last worn by Ranavalona III was taken with her into exile, first to Réunion and then later to Algiers, where she eventually died in 1917. A golden zinc top ornament for a ceremony canopy, usually called "crown of the Queen Ranavalona III", can now be seen in the Musée de l'Armée in Paris.

=== Nigeria ===
The Nigerian Royal Regalia is normally kept in the capital cities of the respective traditional states. Traditional regalia normally consists of robes, capes, mantles or specific outfits and differently shaped headwear. The Yoruba people's Oba wears a crown that is a cap, weaved with glass beads onto a metal frame.

=== Nigerian kingdoms ===
- Abeokuta
- Adamawa
- Akure
- Benin
- Borno
- Edo
- Fika
- Gombe
- Ibadan
- Ijebu
- Ile Ife
- Ilorin
- Issele-Uku
- Jos
- Kano
- Katsina
- Lagos
- Onitsha
- Oshogbo
- Oyo
- Sokoto
- Tiv
- Warri
- Zaria (*Zazzau)
- Zamfara

=== South Africa ===
- Zulu Kingdom

=== Tanzania ===
- Zanzibar

=== Uganda ===
There are several kingdoms in Uganda. During the upheavals after gaining independence, the monarchies were abolished. Only in the 1990s were the various kings restored to their thrones. Although they do not wield any political power any more, they are still a symbol of unity and continuance to their people. The royal regalia normally consisted of the Royal Drums, and are kept at the various palaces in the capital cities of the Ugandan states.

A list of some of the kingdoms

- Ankole
- Buganda
- Bunyoro
- Busoga
- Toro

== Asia ==
=== Brunei ===
The royal regalia of Brunei are kept in the Royal Regalia Museum, which was completed in Bandar Seri Begawan in 1992. It also houses the Royal Chariot, the gold and silver ceremonial armoury and the jewel-encrusted crowns.

=== Cambodia ===
The jewel encrusted royal crown was lost after the Cambodian coup d'état of 1970 by Cambodian prime minister Lon Nol in 1970. It bore a similar appearance to the one worn by the King of Thailand. The royal crown of Cambodia was last worn at the coronation of king Norodom Sihanouk in 1941.

A much earlier set of crown jewels, some dating back to the pre-Angkorian period, were stolen by Douglas Latchford, a British antiquities smuggler. After Latchford died in 2020, the regalia, which includes crowns, belts, earrings and jewels, were recovered hidden in boxes in a car boot in London. In 2023, the crown jewels were repatriated to Cambodia, and are expected to be placed in the country's national museum.

=== China ===
The most important item for the assumption of the throne were the Imperial Seals (Chinese: 傳國璽; pinyin: chuán guó xǐ), which gave the emperor the mandate of heaven authority. These are kept either in the Forbidden City or the National Palace Museum. Numerous crowns, robes, jewels and headwear were made especially for coronations and other official events for each individual emperor rather than being passed down.

=== India ===
The Koh-i-Noor diamond, mined in India in antiquity, is now set in the Crown of Queen Elizabeth The Queen Mother.

Aside from regalia of the British Raj, which exists primarily as a part of the crown jewels of the United Kingdom, there are also surviving examples of the regalia of previous and other rulers of India, including some archaeological finds from ancient times. These include extensive examples of regalia surviving from the various Princely States of India and Pakistan.

=== Indonesia ===
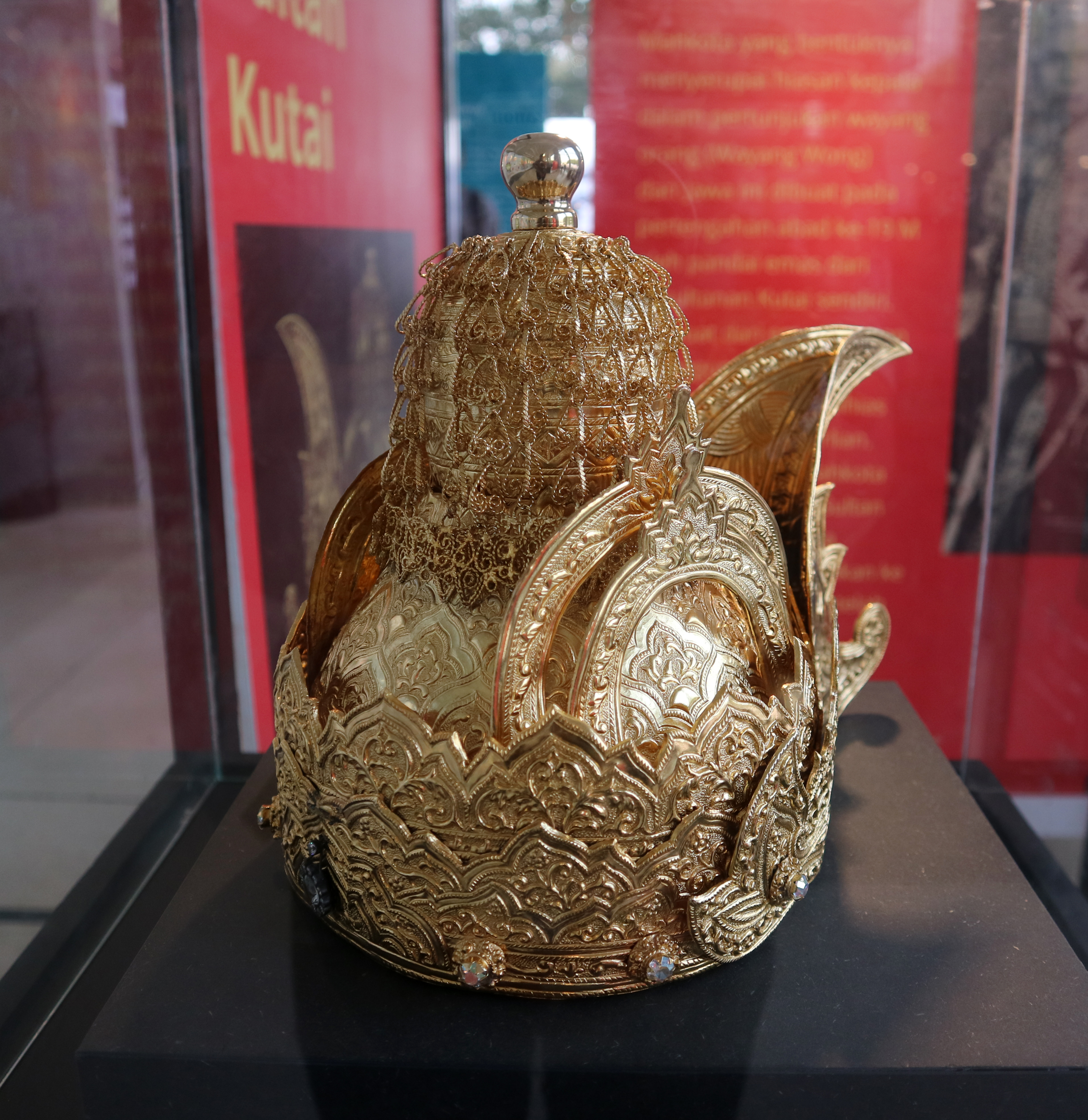
Crown of the Kutai Sultans

Several sultanates and kingdoms in the modern-day region of Indonesia have also kept and owned crown jewels, the most notable being the ones from the Sultanate of Banten, Sultanate of Siak, Sultanate of Ternate, Sultanate of Gowa, Sultanate of Jailolo, Sultanate of Bacan, Sultanate of Kutai Kertanegara, Sumedang Larang Kingdom, Sunda Kingdom and the various Kingdomships of Bali. Most of these crown jewels are within the possession of the National Museum of Indonesia, although some have fallen into foreign possession, with at least one crown belonging to the Buleleng kingdom being shown on display at the Museum of Fine Arts in Houston.

=== Iran ===
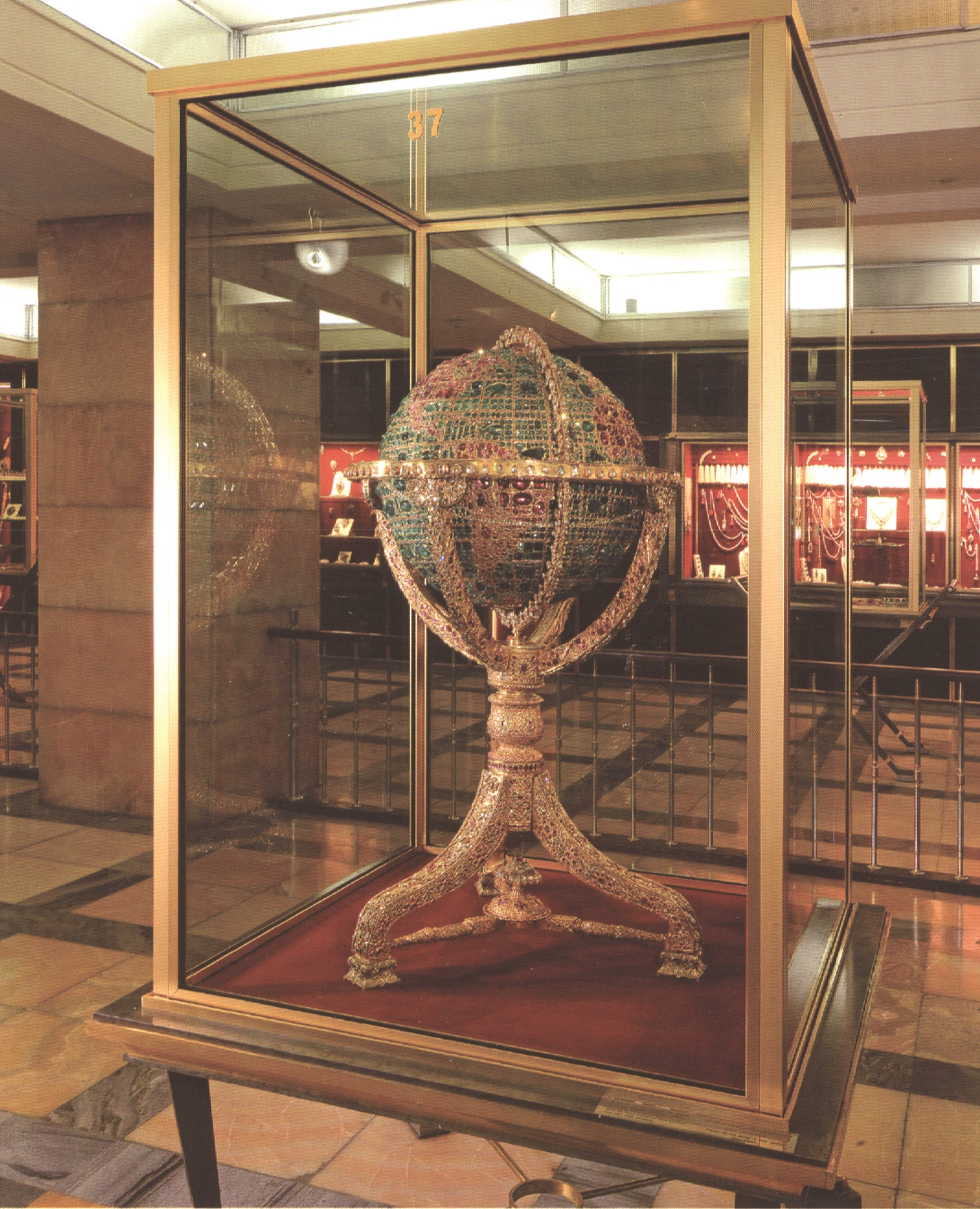
Emeralds define the oceans while rubies define the continents on the jewel-encrusted globe. Iran, Britain, and the equator are shown with diamonds.

The Iranian National Jewels, formerly known as the Crown Jewels of Iran (Persia), include several crowns, 30 tiaras, numerous aigrettes, a dozen jewel-laden swords and shields, a vast number of unset precious gemstones and numerous plates and other dining services cast in precious metals and encrusted with gems. One significant item is a jewel-encrusted globe made by the order of Naser al-Din Shah Qajar.

For centuries the Iranian Crown Jewels were kept in the vaults of the Imperial Treasury. However, in the early 20th century, Reza Shah transferred ownership of the crown jewels to the state as part of a massive restructuring of the country's financial system. In the 1950s, his son and successor, Mohammad Reza Pahlavi, decreed that the most spectacular of these items be put on public display at the Treasury of National Jewels.

=== Japan ===
The Imperial Regalia of Japan (三種の神器, Sanshu no Jingi) ("Three Sacred Treasures") consist of the Holy Sword Kusanagi (草薙剣), the Holy Jewel Yasakani no magatama (八尺瓊曲玉), and the Holy Mirror Yata no kagami (八咫鏡). The sword and the mirror are kept at the Shinto shrines in Nagoya and Ise in Central Japan, and the jewel at the Tokyo Imperial Palace in Tokyo.

The enthronement ceremony is traditionally held in Kyoto. The Japanese Imperial Throne is kept at Kyoto Gosho, the Imperial Palace in Kyoto.

=== Korea ===
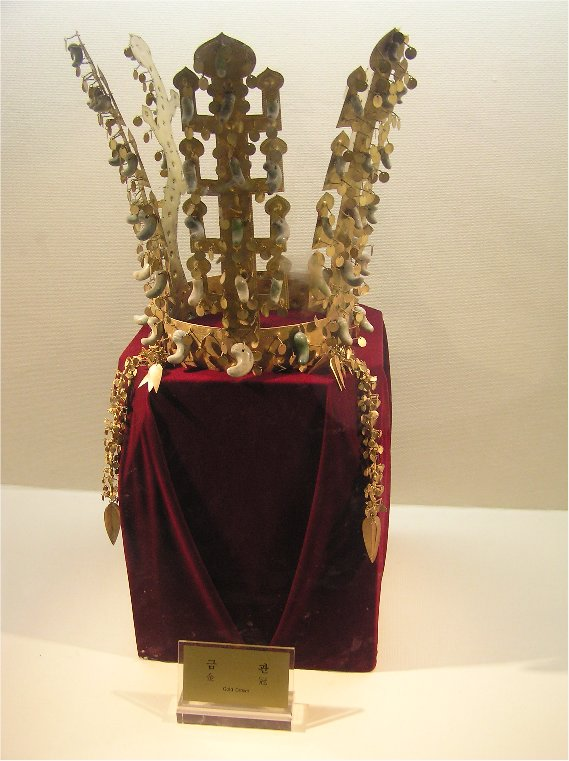
Gold crown from Cheonmachong made in the Korean kingdom of Silla.

There have been a number of crown jewels present in Korea since ancient times, spanning from the ancient Gojoseon dynasty to the last Joseon dynasty. Most of the regalia of these kingdoms, however, have been lost at various points in time, due to the successive rise and fall of the Korean dynasties and the subsequent and frequent raiding of Korean royal tombs and palaces by both Korean and foreign armies. The surviving regalia derive mainly from the Silla, Gaya, Baekje and Joseon dynasties.

The crowns of Silla are noted for their exquisite gold and jade workmanship, which resulted from the spread of goldsmithing technologies from Egypt and Mesopotamia to Korea via the Silk Road. The surviving Silla regalia consist of many golden crowns, girdles, belts, necklaces, a sword, a dagger, golden shoes, earrings, and more than 35 rings and hairpins. However, the Silla custom was that every king and queen had their own set of regalia, hence the regalia for each monarch was buried with them in their tombs, warranting the creation of many different regalia depending on personal preferences, contemporary fashion and available goldsmithing technology.

The Baekje regalia are similar to the Silla regalia, but are even more arabesque and consist of magnificent girdles. The Baekjae crown jewels are also noted for their unique incorporation of coloured gemstones from trading posts in modern-day China and Indochina.

The Joseon dynasty regalia consist of formal jewel-encrusted wigs for the queen and everyday crowns encrusted with various precious gems.

During the period of the Great Korean Empire under Emperor Gojong, the imperial family commissioned many brooches, western-style diadems and tiaras to suit western-style clothes.

=== Laos ===
The regalia of Laos are kept in the Royal Palace Museum in Luang Prabang.

=== Malaysia ===
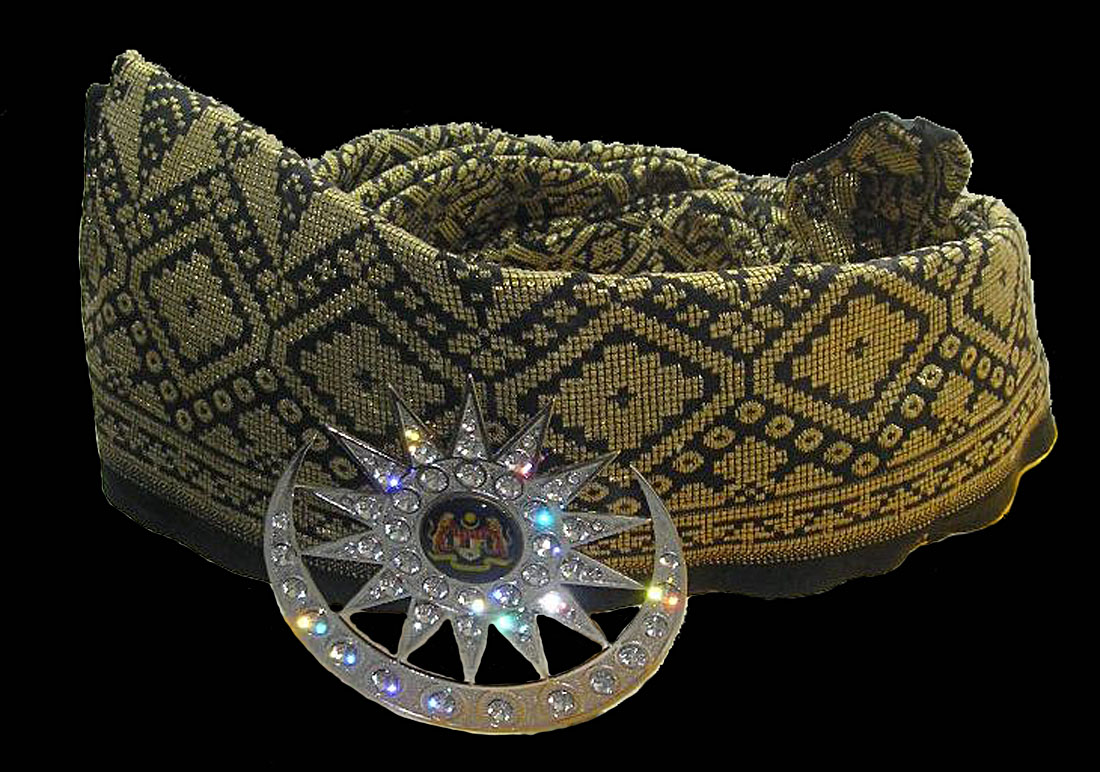
The royal headgear (a copy), Muzium Negara in Kuala Lumpur

The royal regalia of Malaysia are kept in the Istana Negara (National Palace) in Kuala Lumpur. The regalia is worn by the king (Yang di-Pertuan Agong), and queen (Raja Permaisuri Agong) during certain ceremonies, such as the election as head of state, the king's birthday, awards ceremonies, and the calling of parliament.

They consist of the Tengkolok Diraja (Royal Head Dress), the Queen's Gendik Diraja (Royal Tiara), the Keris Panjang Diraja (Royal Long Kris or Keris of State), the Kris Pendek Diraja (Royal Short Keris), the Cogan Alam dan Cogan Agama (Sceptre of the Universe and Sceptre of Religion), the Cokmar (Maces), the Pedang Keris Panjang dan Sundang (Royal sword, long Keris and sword Keris), the Payung Ubur-ubur Kuning dan Tombak Berambu (Yellow-fringed umbrella and tasseled lances), and the Pending Diraja (Royal Waist Buckle).

Malaysia is a federal state, consisting of thirteen states and two federal territories. Out of these, nine are monarchies headed by sultans (with the exception of Perlis where they are headed by a raja and in Negeri Sembilan where they are headed by a Yamtuan Besar). Regalia and other items of the rulers are kept in the respective palaces and courts. These are:

- Johor
- Kedah
- Kelantan
- Negeri Sembilan
- Pahang
- Perak
- Perlis
- Selangor
- Terengganu

=== Myanmar ===
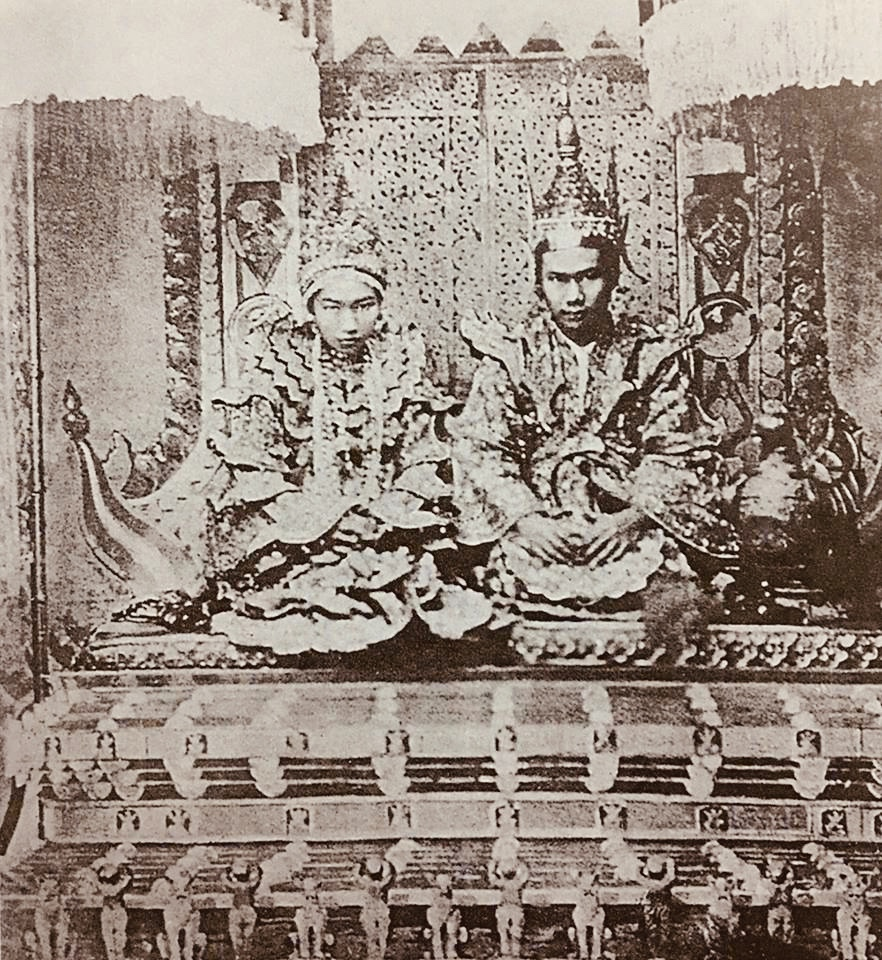
King Thibaw and Queen Supayalat on the Bumblebee Throne at Glass Hall, Mandalay Palace

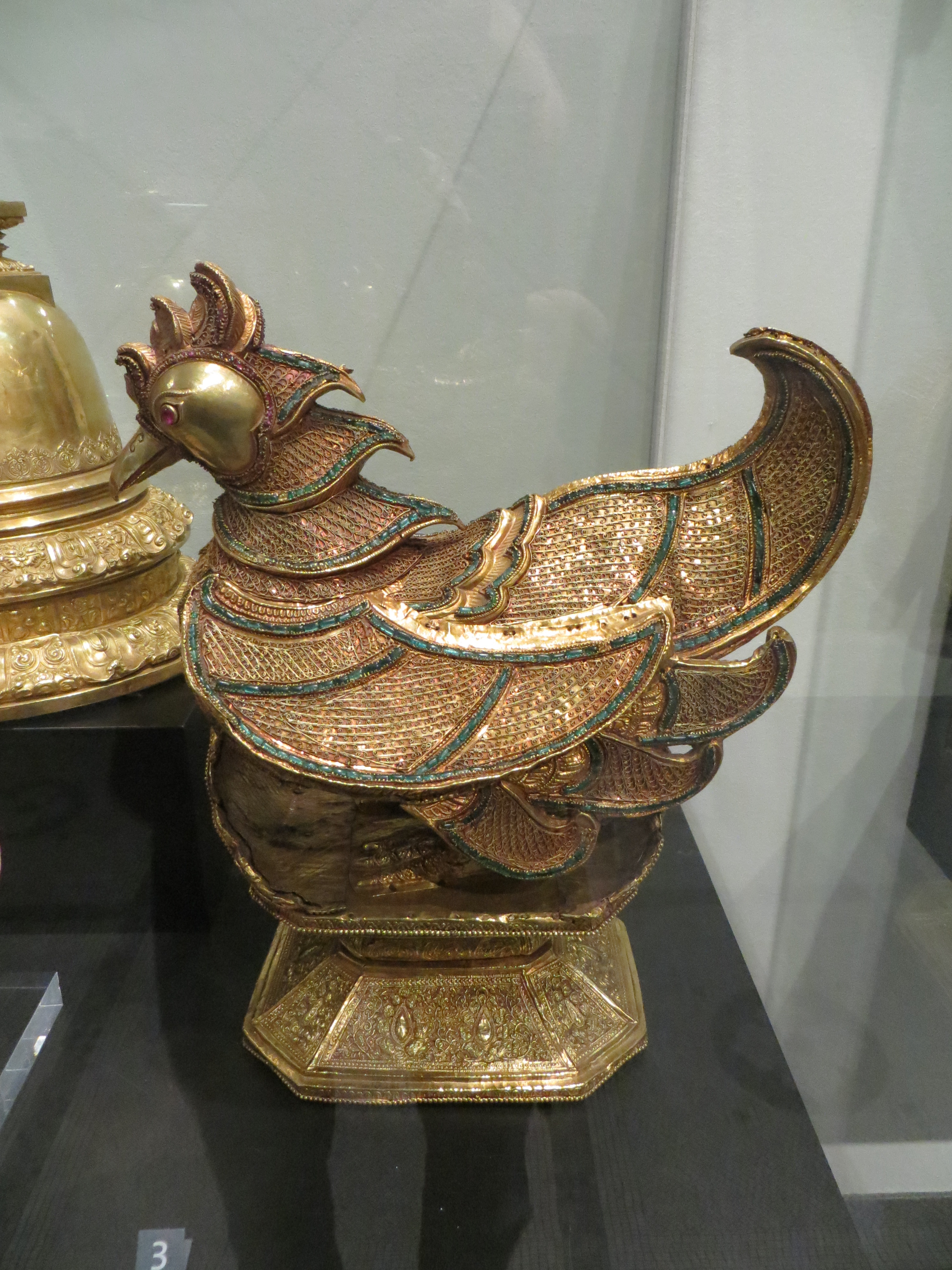
Gold and jewelled container of King Thibaw, the last king of Burma, now in the Victoria and Albert Museum, London

The treasures of Burma's Konbaung dynasty are kept in the National Museum in Yangon. They include the Sihasana Pallanka (Great Lion Throne) and various other royal regalia. Some other items can be seen in the old capital, Mandalay.

=== Sri Lanka ===
The crown, sceptre, sword and throne of the last King of Sri Lanka, King Sri Vikrama Rajasinha of the Kingdom of Kandy, are in the National Museum of Colombo, Sri Lanka.

=== Thailand ===
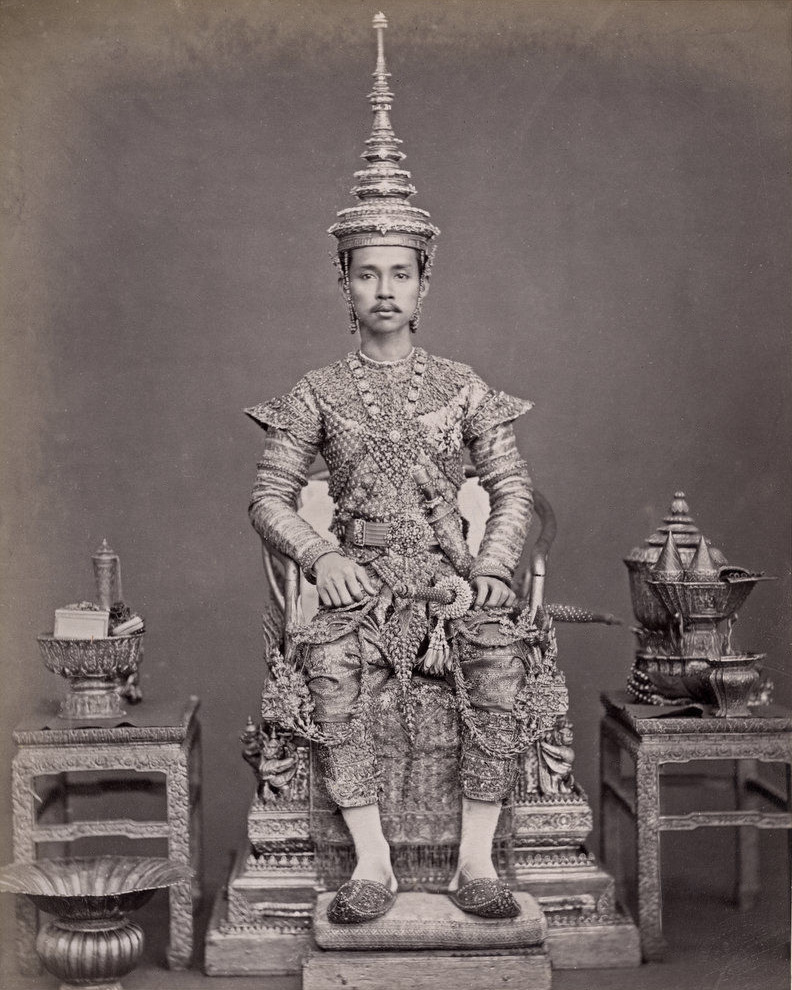
King Chulalongkorn (Rama V), c. 1870

The Regalia of Thailand are the traditional insignia of kingship and symbols of royal authority in the Kingdom of Thailand. Collectively known as the Royal Regalia, Royal Utensils, and the Royal Weapons of Sovereignty, they are used during the coronation of the Thai monarch to signify the full investiture of royal power and the assumption of kingship.

The regalia proper consists of six primary items: the Great Crown of Victory (Phra Maha Phichai Mongkut), the Sword of Victory (Phra Saeng Khan Chai Si), the Royal Staff (Than Phra Kon), the Royal Fan (Walawichani), the Royal Flywhisk (Chamlong Phra Khrueang), and the Royal Slippers (Chalong Phra Bat Choeng Ngon). Each symbolizes aspects of sovereignty and virtue—the crown denotes supreme authority, the sword represents the monarch's might and duty to protect the realm, and the staff signifies righteous rule and guidance.

In addition to these, the regalia set includes the Royal Utensils, comprising ceremonial objects such as the betel nut set, water conch, and other ritual vessels used in royal functions. The Royal Weapons of Sovereignty, numbering eight, represent the king's obligation to defend the nation and uphold justice. Together, these form a complete collection of 28 items traditionally presented to the kings of Thailand at their coronations.

One notable item associated with the regalia is the Golden Jubilee Diamond, a 545.65 carat golden-brown diamond regarded as the largest faceted diamond in the world. It was presented to Bhumibol Adulyadej (Rama IX) in 1997 to commemorate the fiftieth anniversary of his accession to the throne.

The regalia are preserved, along with other royal artifacts, at the Grand Palace in Bangkok, and are displayed during coronations, royal processions, and state ceremonies as enduring symbols of Thai monarchy and sovereignty.

=== Turkey ===
==== Ottoman Empire ====
- The Sword of Osman was used at the enthronement ceremonies of Ottoman Sultans.
- The Spoonmaker's Diamond sits in the Topkapı Palace. It is the palace's most famous exhibit and is the fourth largest diamond of its kind. The diamond is surrounded by myths of all kind.
- Süleyman the Magnificent's Venetian Helmet was a four-tiered papal tiara adorned with diamonds and pearls. It was crafted for Suleiman the Magnificent by Venetian craftsmen and Ibrahim Pasha, Suleiman's Grand Vizier, who helped commission the helmet through his patronage of Alvise Gritti. Engravings by Agostino Veneziano depict Suleiman in his towering headgear. Early in his reign, Suleiman shared a similar level of interest in the patronage of European arts as Mehmed II. Politically, the tiara helped to advance the Ottoman imperium through its Roman-like synthesis of the eastern and western mediterranean. As such, it was a symbolic challenge to Christian sovereignty and rule because it stood taller than the Pope's tiara (which only had three tiers.) Later, as Suleiman's reign began to take an insular turn, the tiara was thought to be donated or put to the wayside, and eventually lost.
- The Topkapı Dagger is a dagger crafted in 1747 as a gift from Sultan Mahmud I to Nadir Shah, the ruler of Persia. The sheath is made of gold and studded with over fifty diamonds. In the center of the handle, lie three large inlaid emeralds. The emeralds are believed to have been shipped from the Muzo emerald mines in Colombia. On the bottom of the grip is an emerald pommel which flips open to reveal a hidden clock. The Topkapı dagger was sent as an attempt to curry favor with the newly empowered Shah. It is held in the Imperial Treasury section of Topkapı Palace. At the time of the dagger's creation, the Persian ruler had recently defeated Mughal forces in modern-day Afghanistan and gained much loot by plundering the rich empire's treasury. One stolen treasure was the famous "Peacock Throne", a gold throne decorated with gemstones; the Shah had a replica of it made, and sent it to Mahmud I. In response, the Sultan sent the Topkapı Dagger; however, it never reached the Shah because of the latter's death in 1747. The dagger was made famous in the movie Topkapi (1964), a heist film based on Eric Ambler's novel The Light of Day (1962). The movie revolves around the planned and, eventually, failed theft of the Topkapı dagger. In some cases, bejeweled daggers, (as well as other precious items), were used to commemorate the opening or renaming of mosques.
- Embellished Cradles were important imperial gifts to newborn Sultanas and Sehzades that were often accompanied with gifts of embroidered quilts and blankets from the treasury steward and members of the court. An imperial procession with further gifts would be undertaken by the Queen mother and the Grand Vizier in honor of the infant child.

=== Vietnam ===
The signs of the imperial power of the Nguyen emperors were the Great Imperial Seal and the Sword. When Bảo Đại, the last emperor of Vietnam, abdicated in August 1945 at Huế he is recorded to have surrendered the royal insignia to the new communist authorities. What happened to them after this is not known, but presumably they took them away, perhaps to Hanoi. In 1949 the former emperor became "Head of State" of the State of Vietnam, was not crowned, and was ousted by his Prime Minister Ngo Dinh Diem in a fraudulent 1955 referendum, and spent the rest of his life in exile. In 1968 the city of Huế was the scene of fierce fighting between the communist People's Army of Vietnam and Vietcong and US Marines and the Army of the Republic of Vietnam. The imperial palace was bombed, ransacked and almost completely destroyed. It is possible that the imperial insignia, if they had not been removed and taken elsewhere in 1945, were lost or destroyed at this time.

== Europe ==
Many artifacts have been found, at various locations, which date to European pre-history, and appear to have been associated with ruling or priestly elites. (For one example, see Golden hat.) The oldest European crown jewels of monarchs are the Iron Crown of Lombardy (9th century, now in Monza), the Imperial Regalia (10th century, now in Vienna), the Holy Crown of Hungary (10th–11th century, now in Budapest) and the Bohemian crown jewels (1347, now in Prague).

=== Albania ===
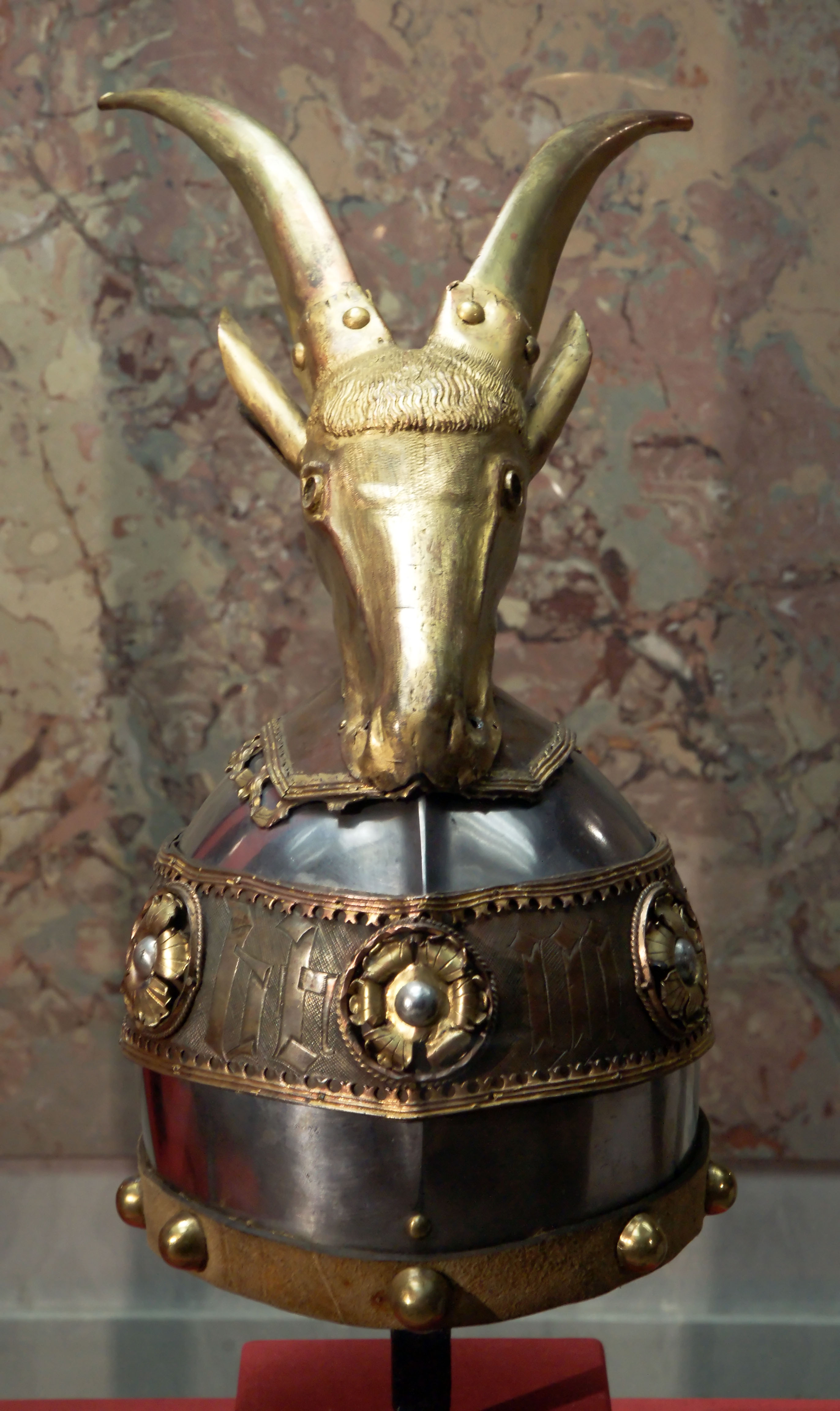
The helmet (crown) of the Albanian warrior king, Skanderbeg, made in 1460.

The crown of Gjergj Kastrioti Skanderbeg, believed to have been created for the medieval king in the 15th century, was smuggled out of Albania by members of the Kastrioti noble family following the occupation of Albania by the Ottoman Empire. Skanderbeg's helmet is made of white metal, adorned with a strip dressed in gold. On its top lies the head of a horned goat made of bronze, also dressed in gold. The bottom part bears a copper strip adorned with a monogram separated by rosettes ✽ IN ✽ PE ✽ RA ✽ TO ✽ RE ✽ BT ✽, which means: Iesus Nazarenus ✽ Principi Emathie ✽ Regi Albaniae ✽ Terrori Osmanorum ✽ Regi Epirotarum ✽ Benedictat Te (Jesus of Nazareth blesses thee, Prince of Emathia (the central region of Albania called Mat), King of Albania, Terror of the Ottomans, King of Epirus). Skanderbeg never held any other title but “Lord of Albania” (Latin: Dominus Albaniae) and strongly pretended the title King of Albania and Epirus. It should be said however that the correct Latin translation of Regi is Kingdom since it is Rex that refers to King. Thus the inscriptions on the helmet may refer to the unsettled name by which Albania was known at the time, as a means to identify Skanderbeg's leadership over all Albanians across regional denominative identifications. The crown eventually found its way into the collections of the Habsburg dynasty (via an Italian noble family) and currently resides in the Imperial Treasury in Vienna, Austria. In 1931, King Zog I of Albania made a rare foreign tour and visited Vienna in an unsuccessful attempt to repatriate the crown, presumably for a future coronation (he considered giving himself the regnal name "Skanderbeg III"). Several replicas exist in Albania, most notably at Kruja Castle.

=== Austria ===
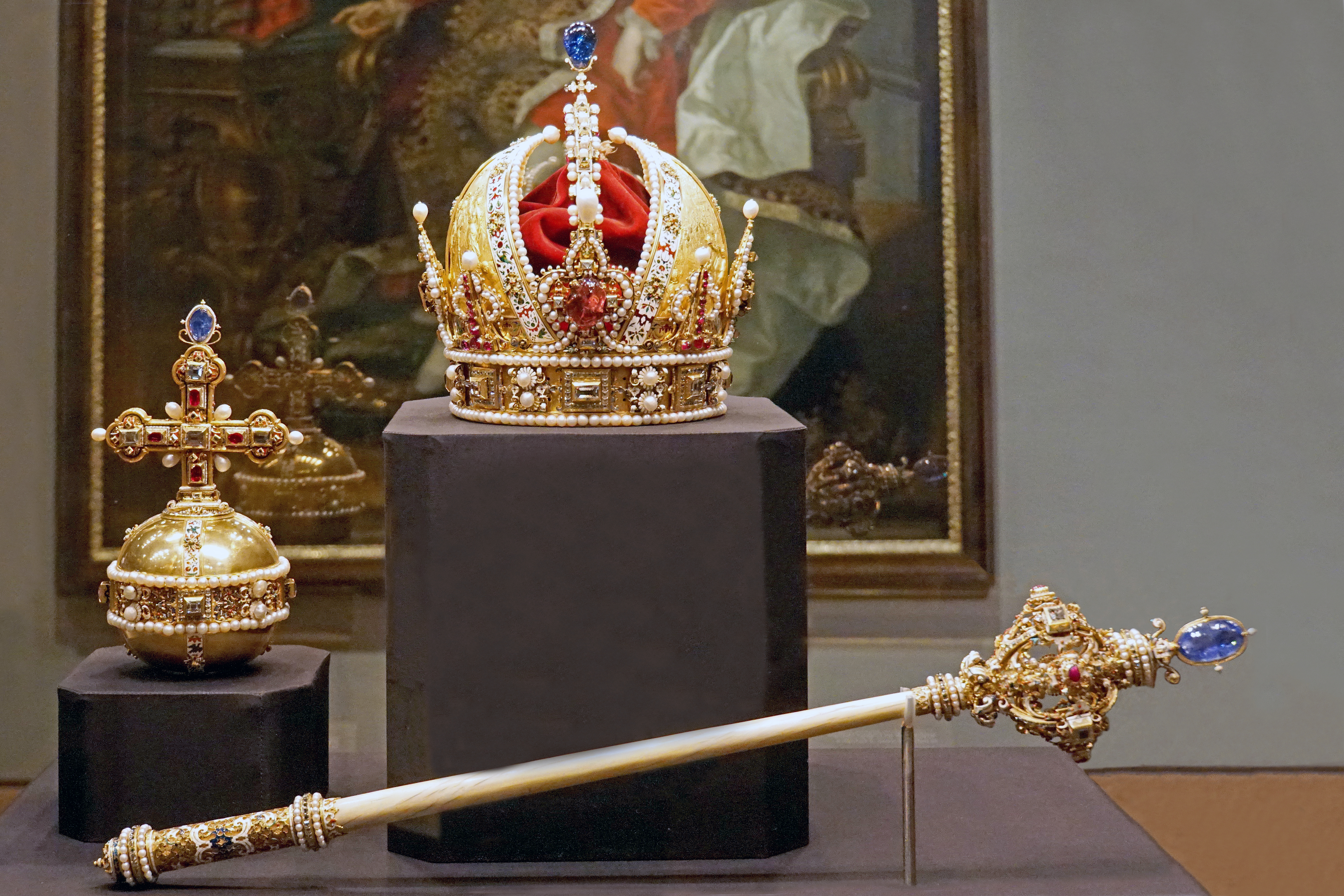
Crown Jewels of Austria. Like most regalia, they include a crown, an orb and a sceptre.

The Austrian Crown Jewels (German: Insignien und Kleinodien) are kept at the Imperial Treasury (the Schatzkammer) located in the Hofburg Palace. They are a collection of imperial regalia and jewels dating from the 10th century to the 19th. They are one of the biggest and most important collection of royal objects still today, and reflect more than a thousand years of European history. The treasury can be divided into six important parts:

- The Insignia of the Austrian Hereditary Homage
- The Austrian Empire
- The Habsburg-Lorraine Household Treasure
- The Holy Roman Empire
- The Burgundian Inheritance and the Order of the Golden Fleece
- The Ecclesiastical Treasury

The most outstanding objects are the ancient crown of the Holy Roman Emperors and also the insignia of the much later hereditary Austrian emperors. They consist of the 10th-century Imperial Crown of the Holy Roman Empire as well as the associated Orb, Cross, and Holy Lance, the Imperial Crown, the Imperial Orb and the mantle of the Austrian Empire, and the Coronation Robes of the Kingdom of Lombardy–Venetia.

- The archducal hat is kept today at the Augustinian Abbey of Klosterneuburg, in Lower Austria. See archducal hat for further information.
- The ducal hat of Styria is kept at the Landesmuseum Joanneum in Graz, Styria.

=== Bohemia ===
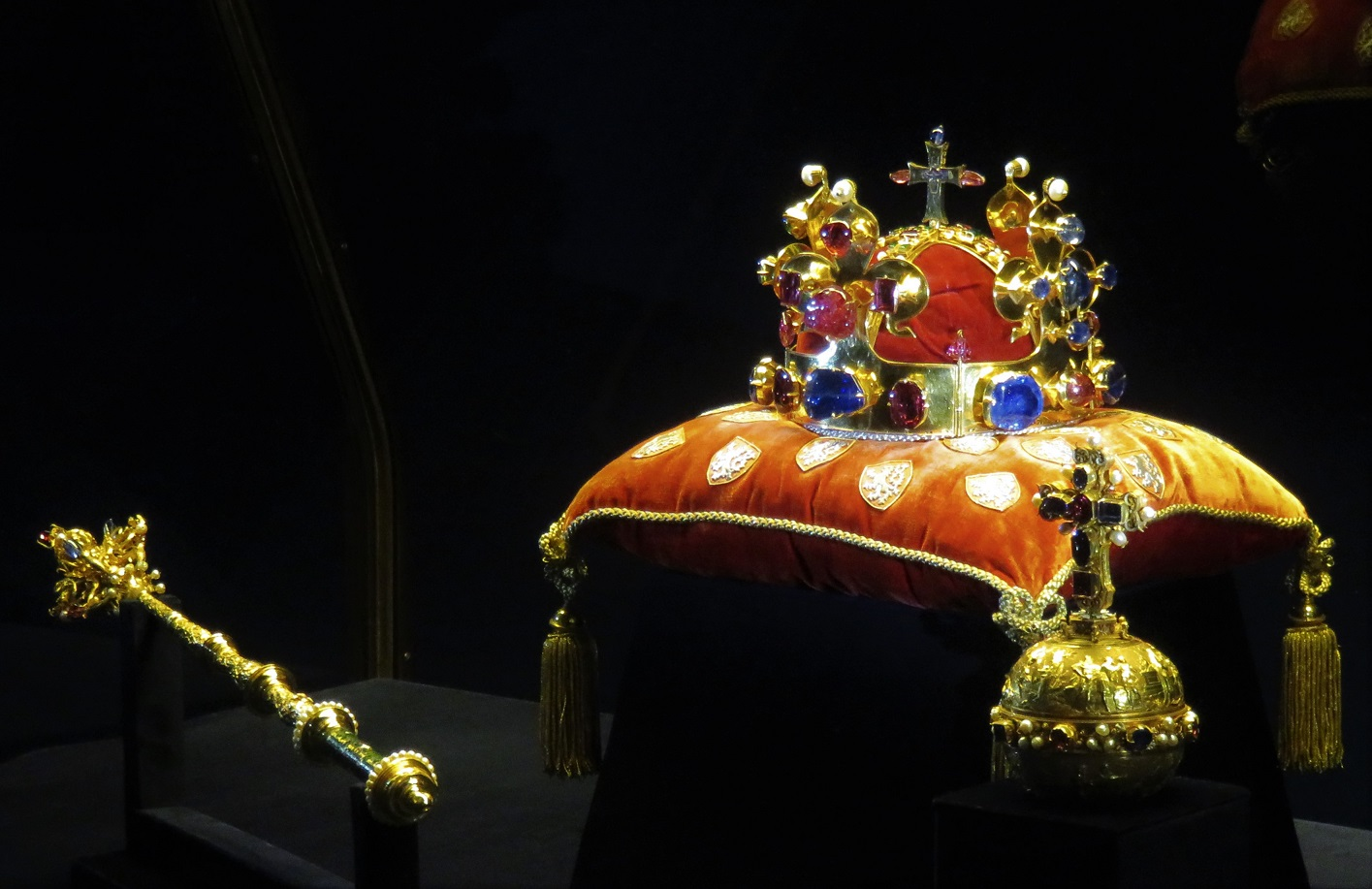
Bohemian Crown Jewels

The Bohemian crown jewels (Czech: korunovační klenoty), and the Crown of Saint Wenceslas of Bohemia (Svatováclavská koruna) are kept in Prague Castle (Pražský hrad) and are displayed to the public about once every eight years. Made of 22-carat gold and set with precious rubies, sapphires, emeralds, and pearls, the crown weighs 2475 grams (about 5 lb 7 oz avoirdupois). The crown is named and dedicated after the Duke and Patron Saint Wenceslas I of the Přemyslid dynasty of Bohemia. The crown has an unusual design, with vertical fleurs-de-lis standing at the front, back and sides. It was made for King Charles IV in 1346. Since 1867 it has been stored in St. Vitus Cathedral in Prague Castle. The jewels have always played an important role as a symbol of Bohemian statehood.

The oldest Czech surviving crown of Ottokar II was made in 1296, probably in Břevnov Monastery.

The sovereign's orb of the jewels is not the original. It was commissioned during the Habsburg era to better fit with the other jewels. The original, plain gold, is kept in the Vienna treasury.

=== Bulgaria ===
The location of the regalia of the First and Second Bulgarian Empire is currently unknown. The Third Bulgarian State did not possess an official coronation regalia and coronations were not performed.

=== Croatia ===
The 11th-century Crown of Zvonimir was a papal gift to King Zvonimir of Croatia. It is thought likely to have been lost during the Ottoman invasions of the Balkans in the 16th century. The distinctive crown adorns several local flags in Croatia.

=== Denmark ===
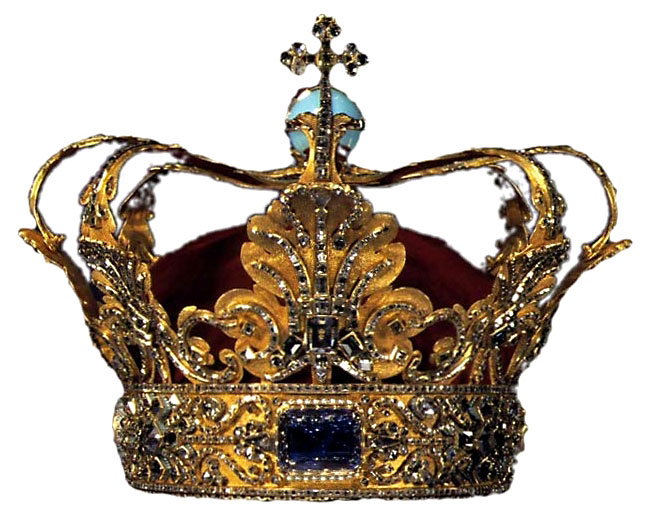
The Crown of Christian V of Denmark

The crown jewels and other royal regalia of Denmark are kept in Rosenborg Castle in Copenhagen.

=== Finland ===
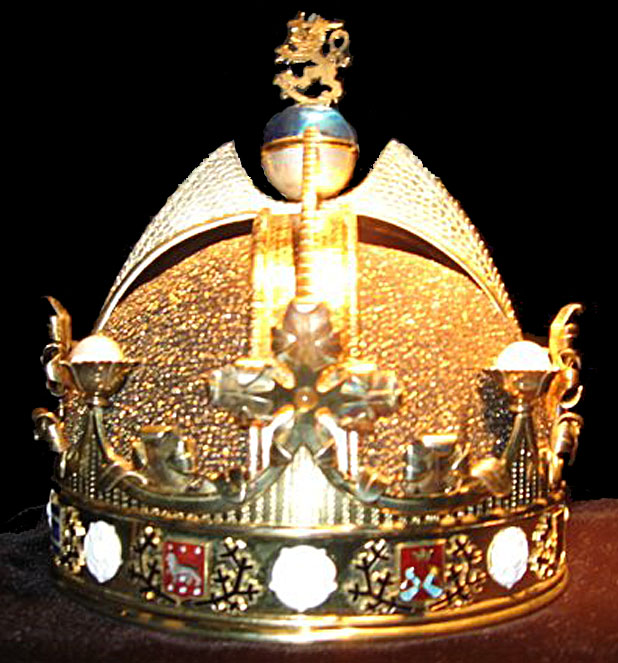
1990s replica of the crown designed for the King of Finland.

In 1918 a crown was designed in Finland for the proposed "King of Finland and Karelia, Duke of Åland, Grand Prince of Lapland, Lord of Kaleva and the North" (Suomen ja Karjalan kuningas, Ahvenanmaan herttua, Lapinmaan suuriruhtinas, Kalevan ja Pohjolan isäntä). However, the political situation changed before the new crown could be used in the coronation ceremony of Finland's first independent monarch. By the end of 1918, the uncrowned monarch had abdicated and Finland had adopted a new republican constitution. The crown which exists today was made by goldsmith Teuvo Ypyä in the 1990s, based on the original drawings, and is kept in a museum in Kemi where it can be seen today. The crown, which is made of gilt silver, consists of a circlet and cap decorated with the arms of the realm's provinces, in enamel. Above the circlet are two arches. Topping the arches is not a globus cruciger like in most European crowns, but a lion rampant as on the coat of arms of Finland. The inner circumference of the crown is approximately 58 centimeters and it weighs about 2 kilograms.

=== France ===
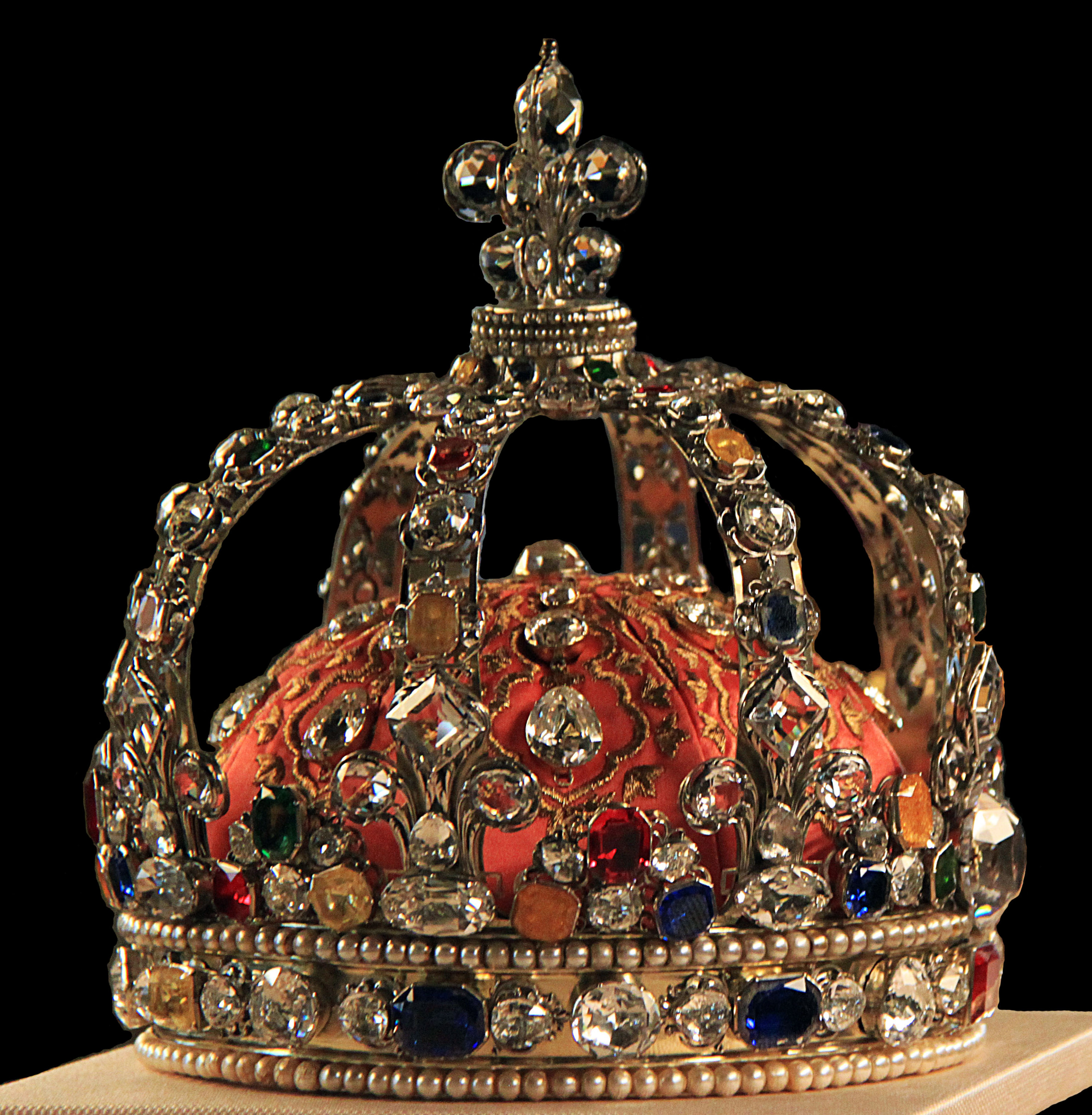
Crown of Louis XV, 1722, Louvre.

The surviving French crown jewels and main regalia including a set of historic crowns are principally on display in the Galerie d'Apollon of the Louvre, France's premier museum and former royal palace, and scattered in different museums like the National Library of France, the Basilica of Saint Denis the Natural history museum, the École des Mines or in Reims.

==== Brittany ====
The Dukes of Brittany were crowned with a royal crown said to be that of the former kings of Brittany in a ceremony designed to emphasise the royal ancestry and sovereignty of the reigning duke. After the marriage of Anne of Brittany to Charles VIII of France in 1513 Breton independence began to slip away. The last person known to have been crowned in Brittany with their royal crown was Francis III, Duke of Brittany in 1524. He was a member of the ruling dynasty of France and heir to the French throne. He died in 1536 and was succeeded as dauphin by his brother Henry. Henry became King Henry II of France in 1547 when his father, Francis I, died. Neither Henry nor any of his successors bothered to get crowned separately as Duke of Brittany but did use the title. The location of the Breton crown is unknown but it is thought to have been moved to Paris at some point. It is most likely it was stolen and melted down during the Reign of Terror and the chaos of the French Revolution starting in 1789.

==== Burgundy ====
The Dukes of Burgundy had a jewelled "Ducal Hat" rather than a formal crown which they wore for ceremonial occasions. This hat was lost by Charles the Bold at the Battle of Grandson in 1476 when his army was routed and his baggage train was captured by the Swiss. After the battle it came into the hands of the canton of Basel, which hid it. Charles the Bold was killed at the Battle of Nancy the following year and the hat re-emerged to be sold first to the Fuggers in 1506 and then later to Maximilian I, Holy Roman Emperor. What happened to the hat after this is not known. Presumably, after this it was kept for a while by successive emperors (particularly Emperor Charles V who was also the Duke of Burgundy) but at some point it was lost or broken up.

=== Georgia ===
==== Kartli-Kakheti ====
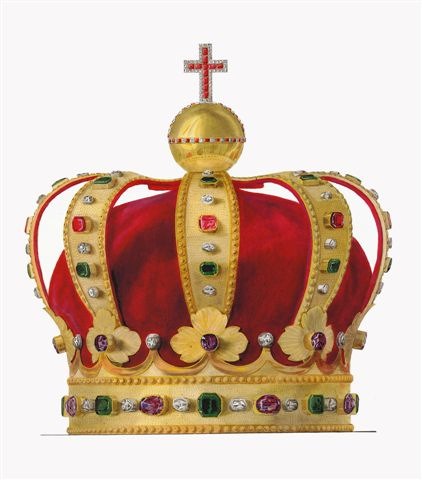
Crown of George XII of Georgia.

Georgian crown of the 16th century

There is no information about any crown for Kartli-Kakheti predating 1798 although presumably there was one. It is likely that the ancient crown or crowns, traditionally kept at Mtskheta, were lost in 1795 when Shah Agha Mohammed Khan of Persia invaded Kartli and ravaged the kingdom. A replacement crown was commissioned by George XII of Georgia for his coronation in 1798. It was made in Russia and deviated from the traditional Georgian design. It was a closed crown or "corona clausa" made of gold and decorated with 145 diamonds, 58 rubies, 24 emeralds and 16 amethysts. It took the form of a circlet surmounted by ornaments and eight arches. A globe surmounted by a cross rested on the top of the crown. Following the death of George XII in 1800 the crown was sent to Moscow and deposited in the Kremlin to prevent the coronation of any of his successors. In 1923 it was presented to the National Museum of Georgia in Tbilisi but in 1930 it was once again sent back to Moscow where this time it was broken up or sold abroad.

==== Imereti ====
The Crown of Imereti dating from the 12th century and believed to have been commissioned by David IV of Georgia was known to have been kept at the monastery at Gelati after the last king Solomon II was deposed in 1810 and Imereti occupied by Russia. It is recorded as remaining there until at least 1917 after which it disappears from the record, presumably stolen or destroyed during the communist revolution, but perhaps hidden.

=== Germany ===
==== Baden ====
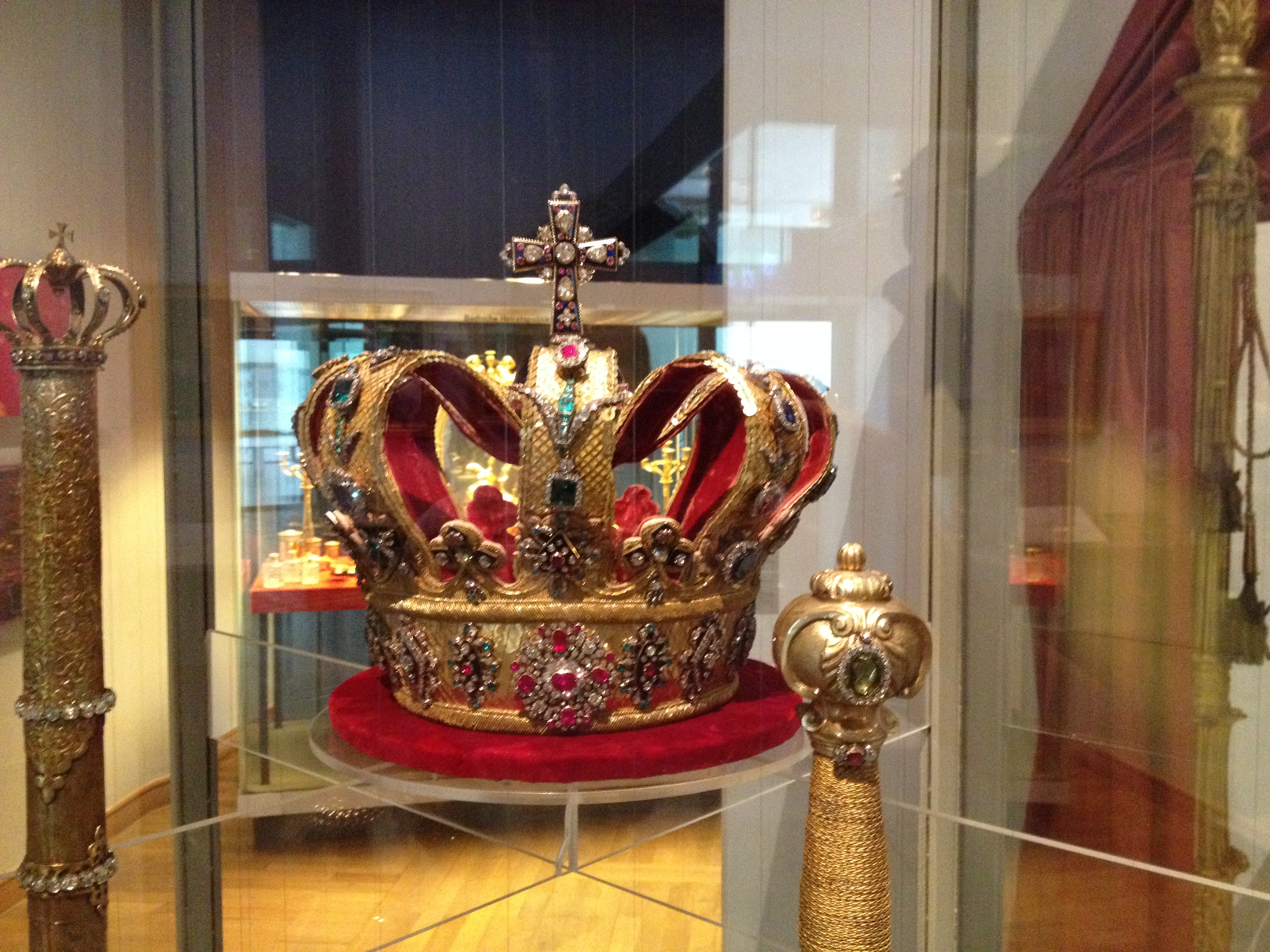
Crown of Baden in the Badische Landesmuseum

Grand Duke Karl II of Baden was the person to commission the grand ducal crown, although he died before its completion in 1811. The design of the crown follows the general pattern typical of a European royal crown, but is unique in that the circlet and the arches of the crown are made of gold fabric rather than of a precious metal such as gold or silver-gilt. The precious stones which ornament this crown are in metal settings which are attached to this circlet and these arches much like brooches pinned to fabric. At the intersection of the four arches of this crown is a blue enameled orb and a cross both set with diamonds. The cap on the inside of the crown is made of the same crimson velvet which also covers the reverse sides of the arches of the crown.

==== Bavaria ====
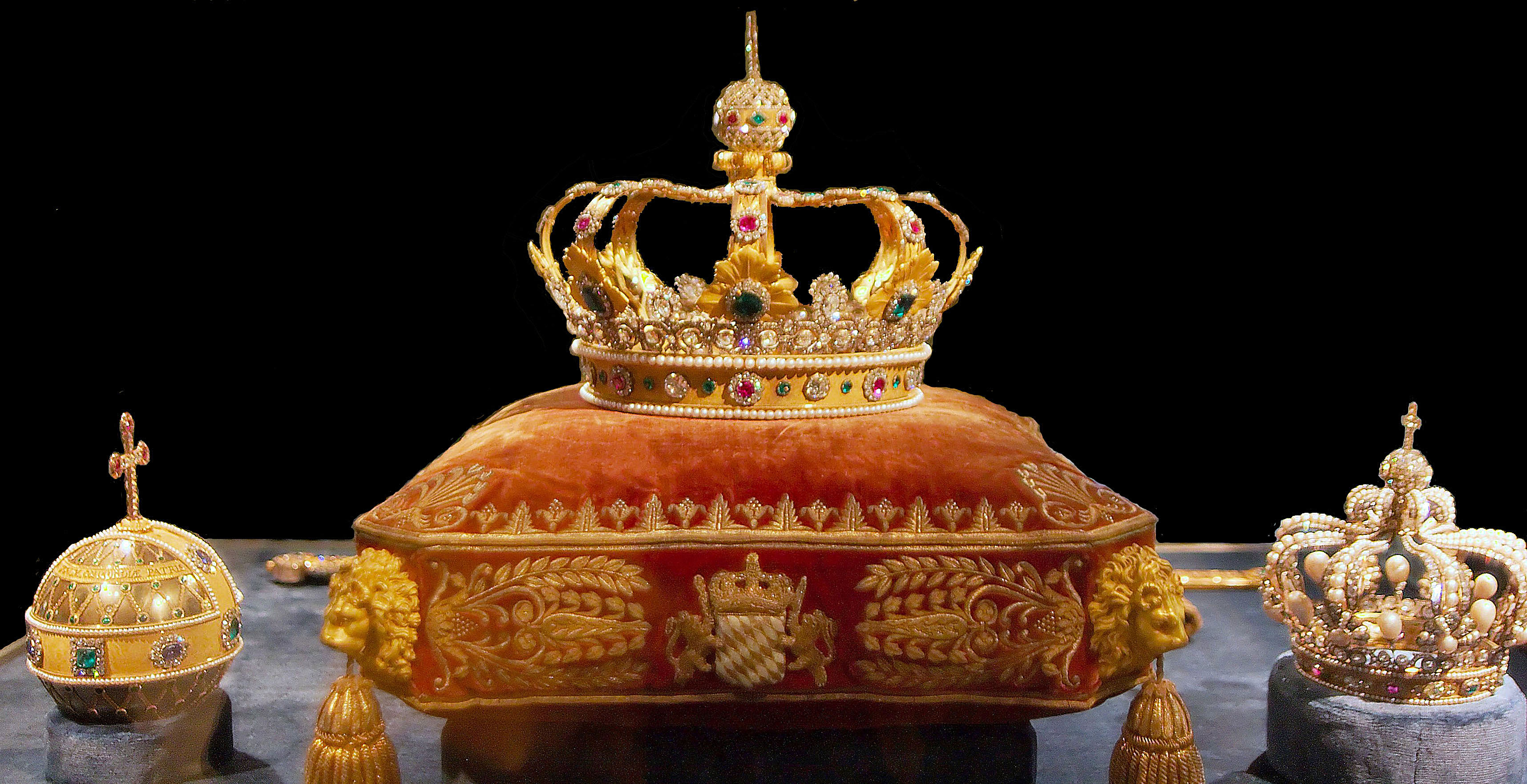
Crown jewels of Bavaria

In 1806, Napoleon I of France conquered the Holy Roman Empire. He restructured the many German states and the Duchy of Bavaria was promoted to a kingdom. The ruling Wittelsbach duke became King Maximilian of Bavaria. With his new status, the king ordered new regalia to be made, which included the 35.56-carat (7.112 g) Wittelsbach Diamond, an oval Old Mine cut blue diamond. The diamond's history dates back to the 1660s and for the most part has been uneventful. The gem was offered with other Bavarian crown jewels in a 1931 auction at Christie's in London, but apparently it did not sell, nor did it return to its display in Munich. Rumours included one that the stone had been sold illegally in 1932 through a Munich jeweller and had reappeared in the Netherlands. Later research indicated that the gem had actually been sold in Belgium in 1951 and that it had changed hands again in 1955. In 1958 millions of visitors came to Brussels for the World Exhibition, which included the jewellery display which included a large blue diamond. But no one was aware it was the missing Wittelsbach Diamond. In January 1962 Joseph Komkommer, a leading figure in the Belgian diamond industry, received a phone call asking him to look at an Old Mine cut diamond with a view of its recutting. When he opened the package he found a dark blue diamond, which is among the rarest and most valuable of gems. Komkommer at once recognized that the diamond was one of historical significance and that it would be a tragedy to recut it. With the assistance of his son, Jacques Komkommer, he identified the diamond as the 'lost' blue diamond. He thereupon formed a consortium of diamond buyers from Belgium and the United States which purchased the diamond, then valued at £180,000. The vendors were the trustees of an estate whose identity remained undisclosed. Finally, the Wittelsbach was acquired by private collector in 1964. It was announced in October 2008 the diamond would be offered for auction at Christie's in December. Its original Golden Fleece ornament can be seen today in the Treasury of the Residenz Palace in Munich, a blue glass replica of the Wittelsbach in place of where the diamond was set.

The Bavarian Coronation Set consists of the Crown of Bavaria, the Crown of the Queen (originally made for Maximilian's Queen, Caroline Frederika of Baden), the State Sword, the Royal Orb and the Royal Sceptre.

==== Hessen ====
Most of the crown jewels were stolen and destroyed by US army officers after the end of World War II. See Schlosshotel Kronberg.

==== Prussia ====
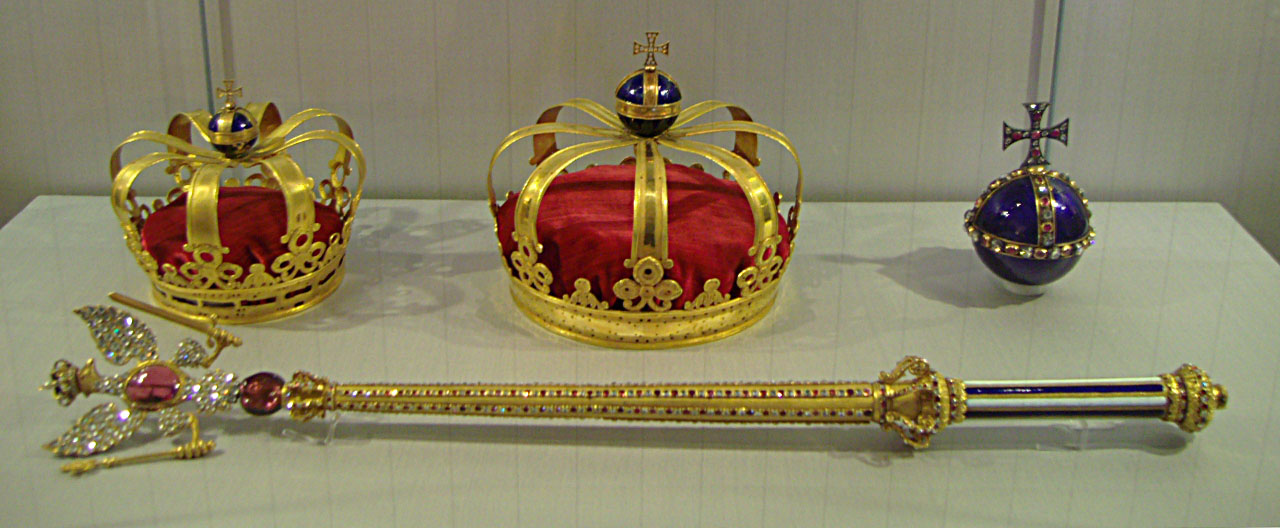
Left: crown of Sophie Charlotte, middle: Crown of Frederick I, bottom: royal sceptre of Frederick I, right: royal orb of Frederick I.

The crown and the insignia of the Kingdom of Prussia are kept at Hohenzollern Castle in Sigmaringen, Baden-Württemberg.

The Prussian Crown Jewels are kept at Schloss Charlottenburg in Berlin.

==== Saxony ====
The Treasures and Crown Jewels of the Kings of Saxony are kept in Dresden.

==== Württemberg ====
The treasures of the Kings of Württemberg are kept in the Württemberg State Museum in Stuttgart.

==== Holy Roman Empire ====
The Imperial Regalia like the Holy Crown of Charlemagne, the orb, the sceptre, the Holy Lance, and various other items are kept in the Schatzkammer Treasury in Vienna, Austria. Aside from those items already present in Vienna, the last Holy Roman Emperor, Francis II, brought there much of the Imperial regalia traditionally located elsewhere, before the final collapse of the Holy Roman Empire in 1806.

Other objects associated with the coronation of Holy Roman Emperors can be found in Aachen, in the treasury of the Aachen Cathedral. The cathedral also houses a stone throne associated with Charlemagne, and was a traditional site for certain of the Imperial coronation ceremonies. The Aachen City Hall houses copies of several important items of the Imperial regalia, now in Vienna, which had previously been kept in their city. Both the old city hall and the core of the cathedral were once parts of the palace of Charlemagne.

==== German Empire (1871–1918) ====
A new crown design was created for the new German empire, and used extensively in heraldic and other national emblems; however the actual crown itself was never constructed, aside from models. It resembled the Imperial Crown of the Holy Roman Empire, although not intended as an exact copy. Its use as a national emblem was discontinued after the collapse of the German monarchy in November 1918; examples of the design can still be found on various buildings and monuments from that era, including the Reichstag.

In practice, the crown jewels of the Kingdom of Prussia were used for the emperors of Germany, with some new items being created.

=== Greece ===
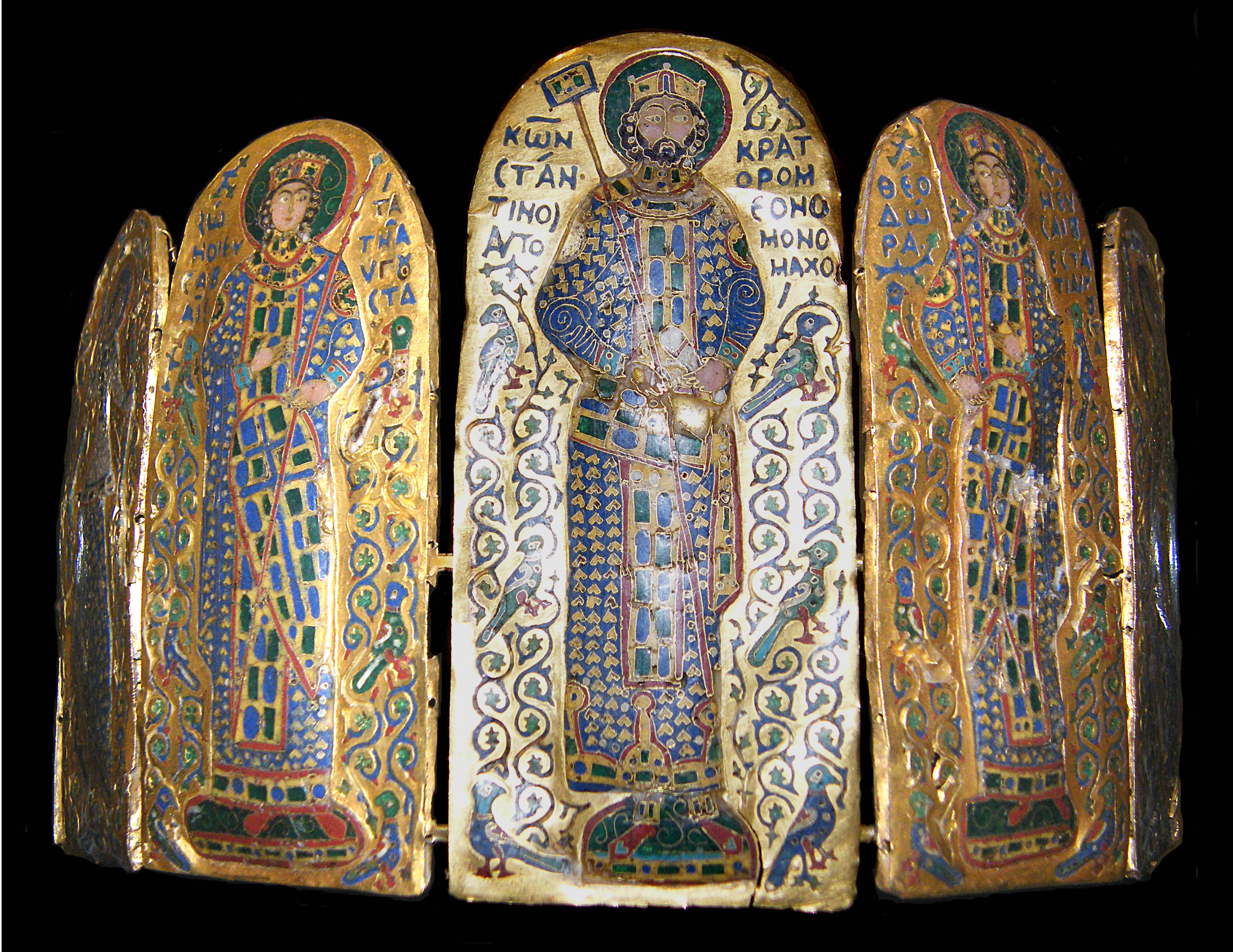
The enamelled plates from the Monomachus Crown (if it is one) showing the Byzantine emperor Constantine IX Monomachos, 1042–1055, now in Budapest.

A set of crown jewels were created for the first modern Greek king, Otto of Greece, but he never wore them and took them with him after fleeing the country. His descendants later returned the regalia to Greece, but they were still never worn by any Greek monarch.

==== Ancient Greece ====
Examples of ancient-classical Greek regalia have been found among royal burial-goods in tombs at various archaeological sites. The most famous examples of which are probably certain of Heinrich Schliemann's finds, artifacts of ancient Crete, and the burials of the Macedonian dynasty.

==== Byzantine Empire ====
In 1343, the empress and regent Anna of Savoy pawned the Byzantine crown jewels to the Republic of Venice for 30,000 ducats as part of an attempt to secure more finances for a civil war; they were never redeemed.

The enamelled plates from the Monomachus Crown showing, but probably not made for, the Byzantine emperor Constantine IX Monomachos, r. 1042–1055, survive in Budapest. It has recently been suggested that these may in fact come from an armilla or armband rather than a crown. Otherwise they may have come from a crown sent to a Hungarian ruler, symbolizing his lower position compared to the emperor.

Other remnants, or claimed remnants, of the regalia of the former Eastern Roman Empire, or items created in the imperial workshops, can be found among the regalia of various European royal houses; having been dispersed at various times and in various ways. Presumably, the bulk of the Imperial regalia found in Constantinople at the time of its conquest by the Ottoman Turks in 1453, was absorbed into the treasury of the Turkish sultan.

=== Hungary ===
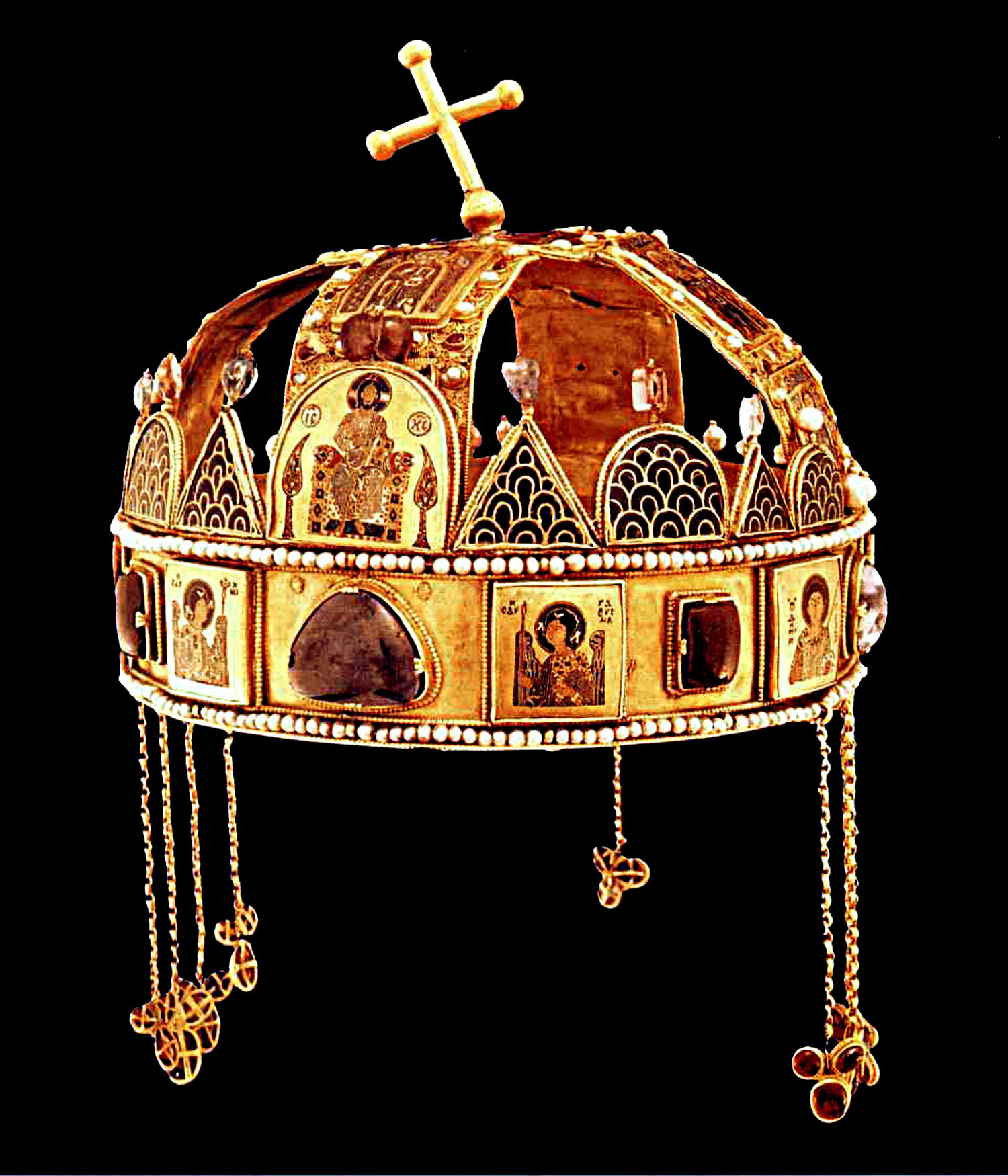
Holy Crown of Hungary

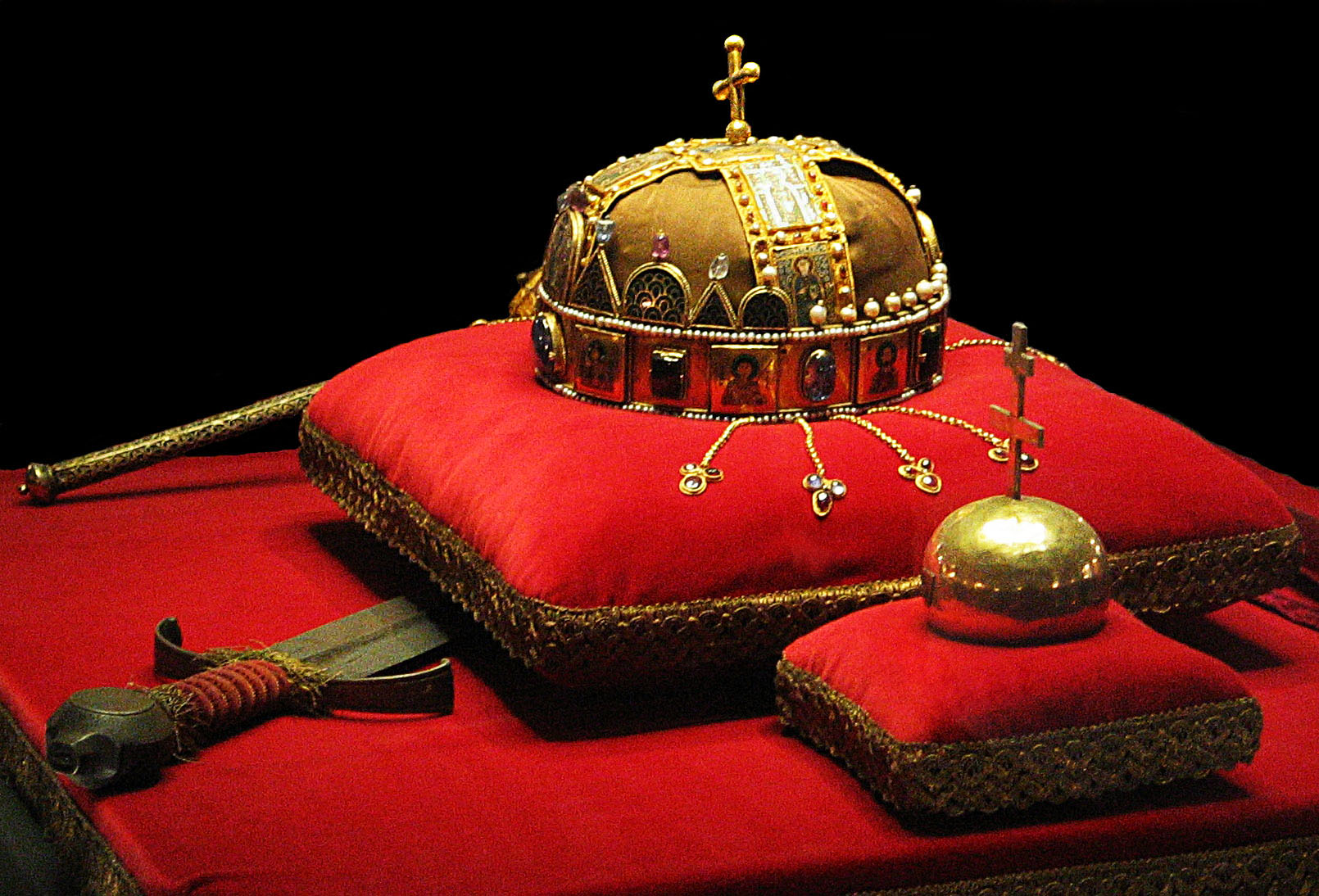
Holy Crown of Hungary (Saint Stephen's Crown), and other pieces of the Hungarian regalia

The "Holy Crown of Hungary", also known as the Crown of Saint Stephen (Hungarian: Magyar Szent Korona, German: Stephanskrone, Croatian: Kruna svetoga Stjepana, Latin: Sacra Corona), was the coronation crown used by the Kingdom of Hungary for most of its existence. The crown was bound to the Lands of the Crown of Saint Stephen, (sometimes the Sacra Corona meant the Land, the Carpathian Basin, but it also meant the coronation body, too). No king of Hungary was regarded as having been truly legitimate without being crowned with it. In the history of Hungary, more than fifty kings were crowned with it (the two kings who were not so crowned were John II Sigismund and Joseph II).

The Hungarian coronation insignia consists of the Holy Crown, the sceptre, the orb, and the mantle. Since the 12th century, kings have been crowned with the still extant crown. The orb has the coat-of-arms of Charles I of Hungary (1310–1342); the other insignia can be linked to Saint Stephen.

It was first called the Holy Crown in 1256. During the 14th century royal power came to be represented not simply by a crown, but by just one specific object: the Holy Crown. This also meant that the Kingdom of Hungary was a special state: they were not looking for a crown to inaugurate a king, but rather, they were looking for a king for the crown; as written by Crown Guard Péter Révay. He also depicts that "the Holy Crown is the same for the Hungarians as the Lost Ark is for the Jewish".

Since 2000, the Holy Crown has been on display in the central Domed Hall of the Hungarian Parliament Building.

=== Ireland ===
The crown jewels of Ireland were heavily jeweled insignia of the Most Illustrious Order of Saint Patrick. They were worn by the sovereign at the installation of knights of that order, the Irish equivalent of the English Most Noble Order of the Garter and the Scottish Most Ancient and Most Noble Order of the Thistle.

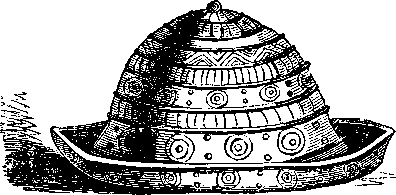
Comerford Crown, picture from: Dublin Penny Journal, Vol. 1, No. 9, August 25, 1832

Older pre-conquest items relevant to the ancient Gaelic dynasties that once ruled Ireland probably also existed. One example of this is an ancient relic called the Comerford or "Ikerrin" Crown that was discovered in 1692 but may have since been lost.

=== Italy ===
- Kingdom of Sicily
- Kingdom of Naples
- Kingdom of two Sicilies
- Lombardy

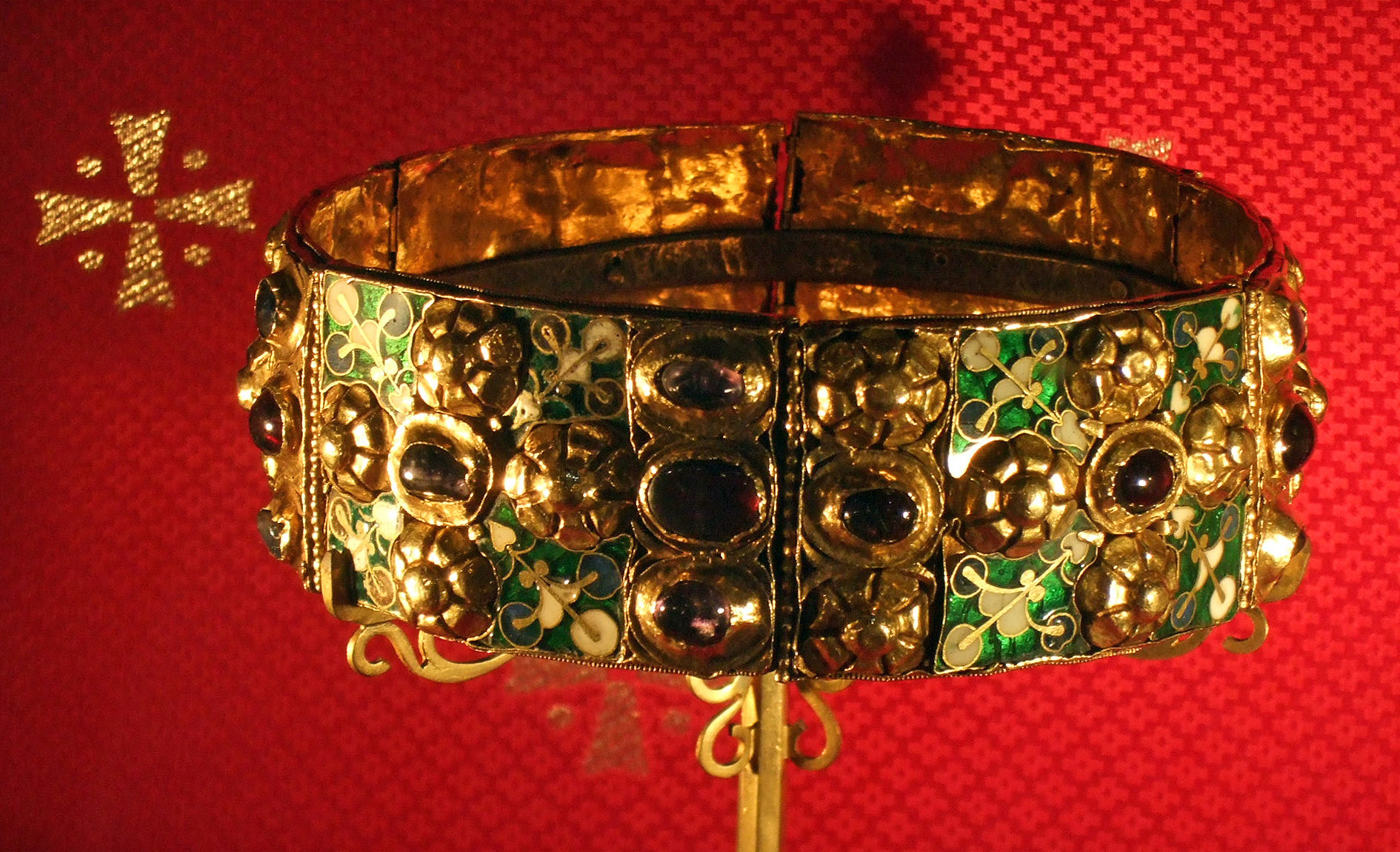
Iron Crown of Lombardy, kept in the Cathedral of Monza.

The Iron Crown of the Lombard Kingdom, later used as crown of the medieval Kingdom of Italy and by Napoleon Bonaparte for its coronation as King of Italy, is kept at the Cathedral of Monza. The coronation robe is kept in the Schatzkammer museum in Vienna, Austria.

- Kings of Italy

The crown jewels of the Kingdom of Italy are in the custody of the Bank of Italy, due to legal controversy between the Italian Republic and the House of Savoy. It is not clear who is the legal owner.

- Grand Dukes of Tuscany

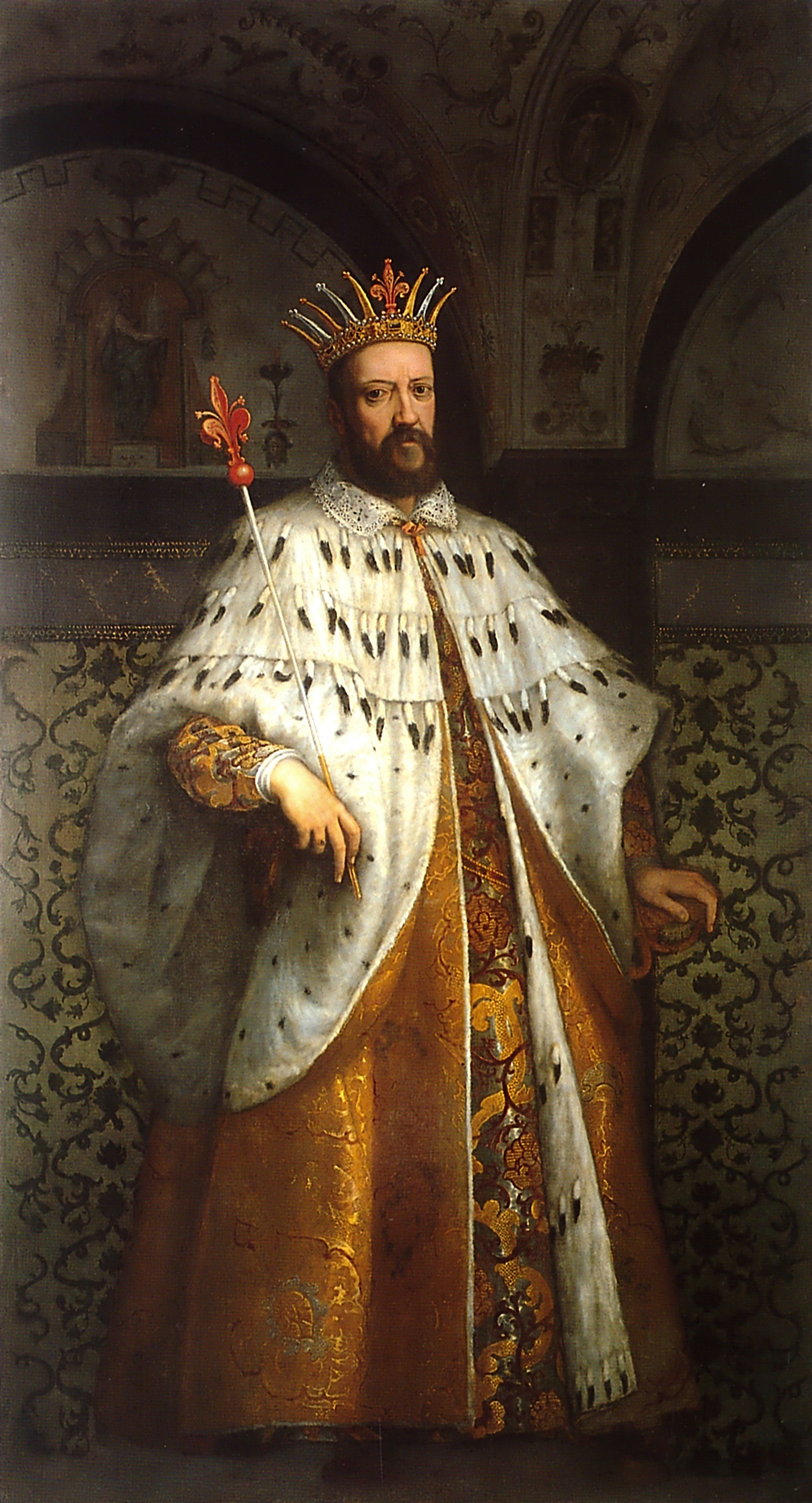
A scepter consisting of a gilt rod topped with a red-enameled globe topped in turn by a red-enameled Florentine Lily also formed part of the regalia of the Grand Dukes of Tuscany.

On being made Grand Duke of Tuscany Cosimo I de' Medici was granted the use of an open radial crown with a representation of the red Florentine fleurs-de-lis with its stamens posed between the petals in place of the ray in the front, completely covered with precious stones, by Pope Pius V, who specified that the circlet of this crown be engraved with an inscription that the crown had been granted him to wear by the pope. On the actual crown this inscription was placed on the back of the circlet, while the front was actually covered with precious stones like the rest of the crown. A sceptre consisting of a gilt rod topped with a red-enameled globe topped in turn by a red-enameled Florentine Lily also formed part of the regalia of the grand dukes of Tuscany. The coronation portrait of the Grand Duke Gian Gaston de' Medici shows the same Florentine grand ducal crown closed with the pearl set arches associated with sovereignty. This crown was also used as the heraldic crown in the arms of the Grand Duchy of Tuscany.

==== Kingdom of Italy (1861-1946) ====
In the modern Kingdom of Italy there has never been an incoronation nor a Head of State has ever worn a crown. The heraldic crown used in the official documents and symbols has never been officially created by the State.

==== Roman Empire ====
Of the imperial regalia of the Roman emperors, previous to the Byzantine era, little remains. The best-known examples, and those with the strongest claim to authenticity, are a sceptre, some fittings for Roman standards, and other small items, all from a cache buried on the Palatine Hill c. the 3rd or 4th century AD, and discovered in 2006. The objects were made of fine bronze, glass, and semi-precious stone. These items were almost certainly intended for personal use by the emperor and his retinue, making them unique surviving examples of their type. The archaeologists who excavated the find have suggested that the items might have belonged to the emperor Maxentius, and may have been concealed by some unknown loyalist followers after his final defeat, and subsequent death. Beyond this, the regalia of the ancient Roman emperors exists primarily in artistic depictions from their time-period.

=== Isle of Man ===
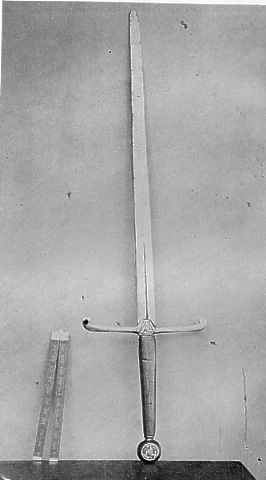
State Sword of Man

The crown jewels of the Kingdom of Man consist of a ceremonial sword known as the Manx Sword of State. The Sword of State is carried by the sword bearer before the King's personal representative to the Isle of Man, the lieutenant governor, in the procession on Tynwald Day each year; it dates from not later than the 12th century. It is popularly said to be the sword of Olaf the Black, who became King of Mann and the Isles in 1226. Recent analysis of the sword has determined that it is a 15th-century design, and probably made in London. The blade itself is thought to have been fitted in the late 16th or 17th century. It is possible that the sword was made for the 1422 Tynwald meeting that was attended by Sir John Stanley. The sword has a two-edged steel blade, 29 inches (74 cm) long, with a hardwood hilt, 9 inches (23 cm)long, which tapers from the guard to the pommel. The guard is a thin steel band, 11 inches (28 cm) across, surmounted where the guard intersects the blade with shields carrying the 'Three Legs of Man', which also appear on the flattened pommel.

=== Monaco ===
Monaco features a heraldic crown on its coat-of-arms, but does not possess any crown jewels or regalia per se.

=== Norway ===
The Crown Regalia, or crown jewels, of Norway are together with some other old treasures on permanent display in an exhibition at the Archbishop's Palace next to the Nidaros Cathedral, in Trondheim.

=== Poland ===
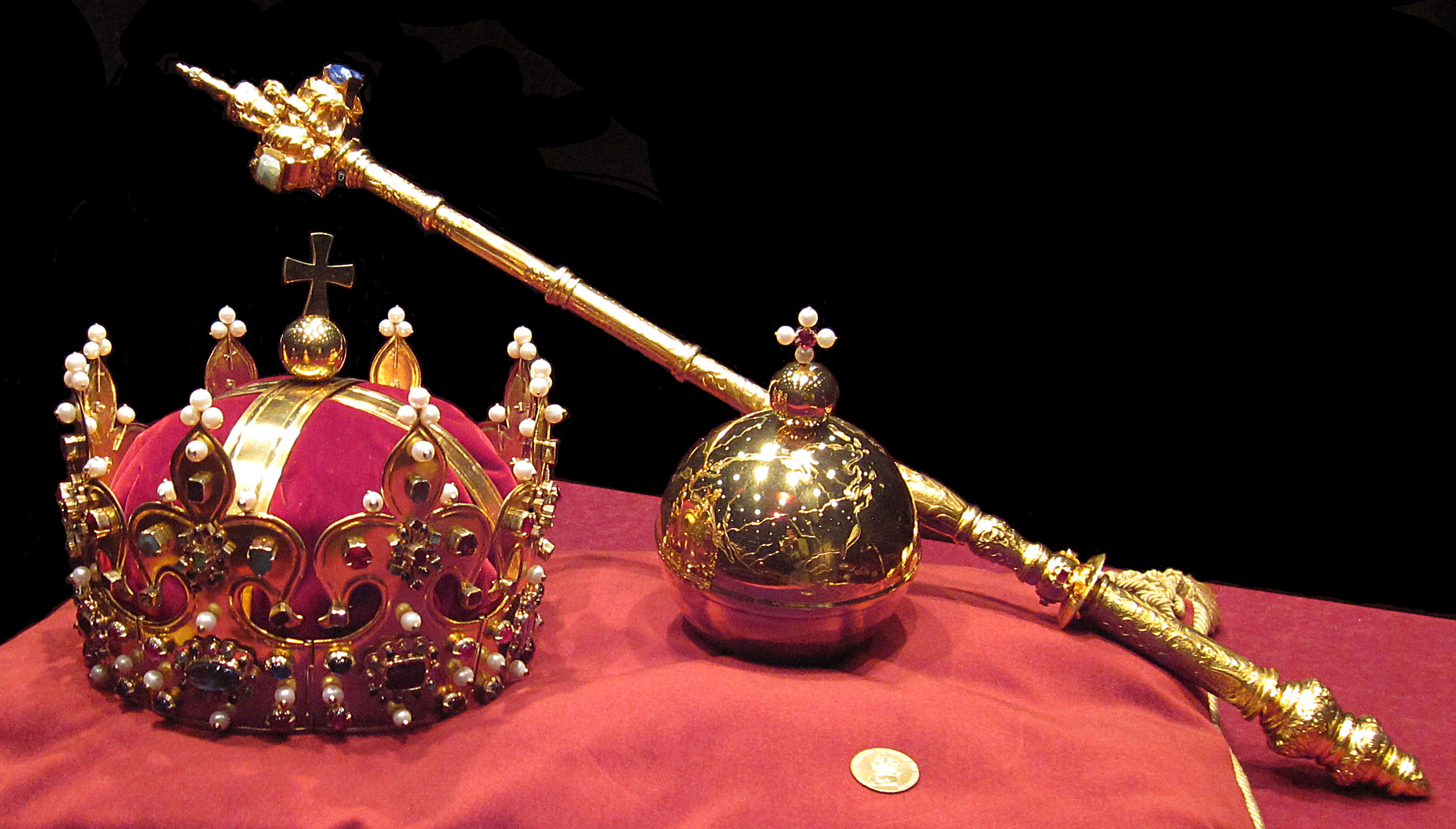
The Polish Crown Jewels on display at the Wawel Royal Castle Museum

The only surviving part of the Polish crown jewels is from the Piast dynasty and consists of the coronation sword known as the Szczerbiec. It is currently on display along with other royal items in the Wawel Royal Castle Museum, Kraków. Most of the crown jewels were plundered by retreating Prussian troops from Kraków in 1794.

One of many royal crowns was made for King Augustus II, Elector of Saxony when he became King of Poland in 1697. Since the original set was unavailable, a new set was made for the coronation in Kraków. However, the original set was regained, and the new set was never used. Today it is displayed in the Royal Castle in Dresden, Germany.

Similarly to Augustus II, his son Augustus III had difficulties with reaching the original set, and was forced to order a creation of a new one. His and his wives' crown jewels are the only Polish regalia set used for the coronation that have survived in its entirety.

=== Portugal ===
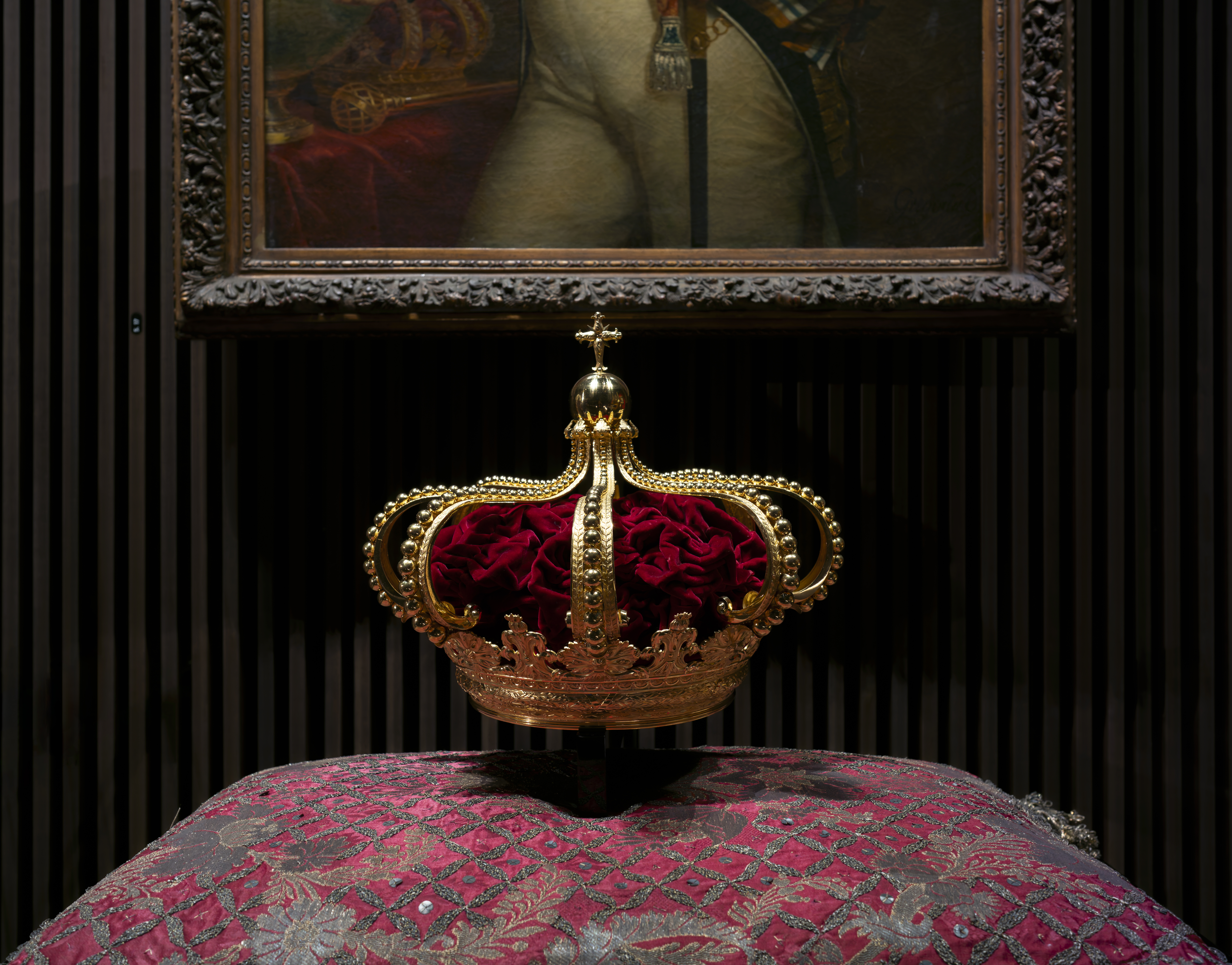
The crown of John VI; Ajuda National Palace.

The Portuguese Crown Jewels were the pieces of jewelry, regalia, and vestments worn by the monarchs of Portugal during the time of the Portuguese Monarchy. Over the nine centuries of Portuguese history, the Portuguese Crown Jewels have lost and gained many pieces. Most of the current set of the Portuguese Crown Jewels are from the reigns of King João VI and King Luís I.

=== Romania ===
The Romanian crown jewels consist of three crowns: the Steel Crown, the Crown of Queen Elisabeta and the Crown of Queen Marie; and two scepters: the Scepter of Ferdinand I and the Scepter of Carol II. They are displayed at the National Museum of Romanian History in Bucharest.

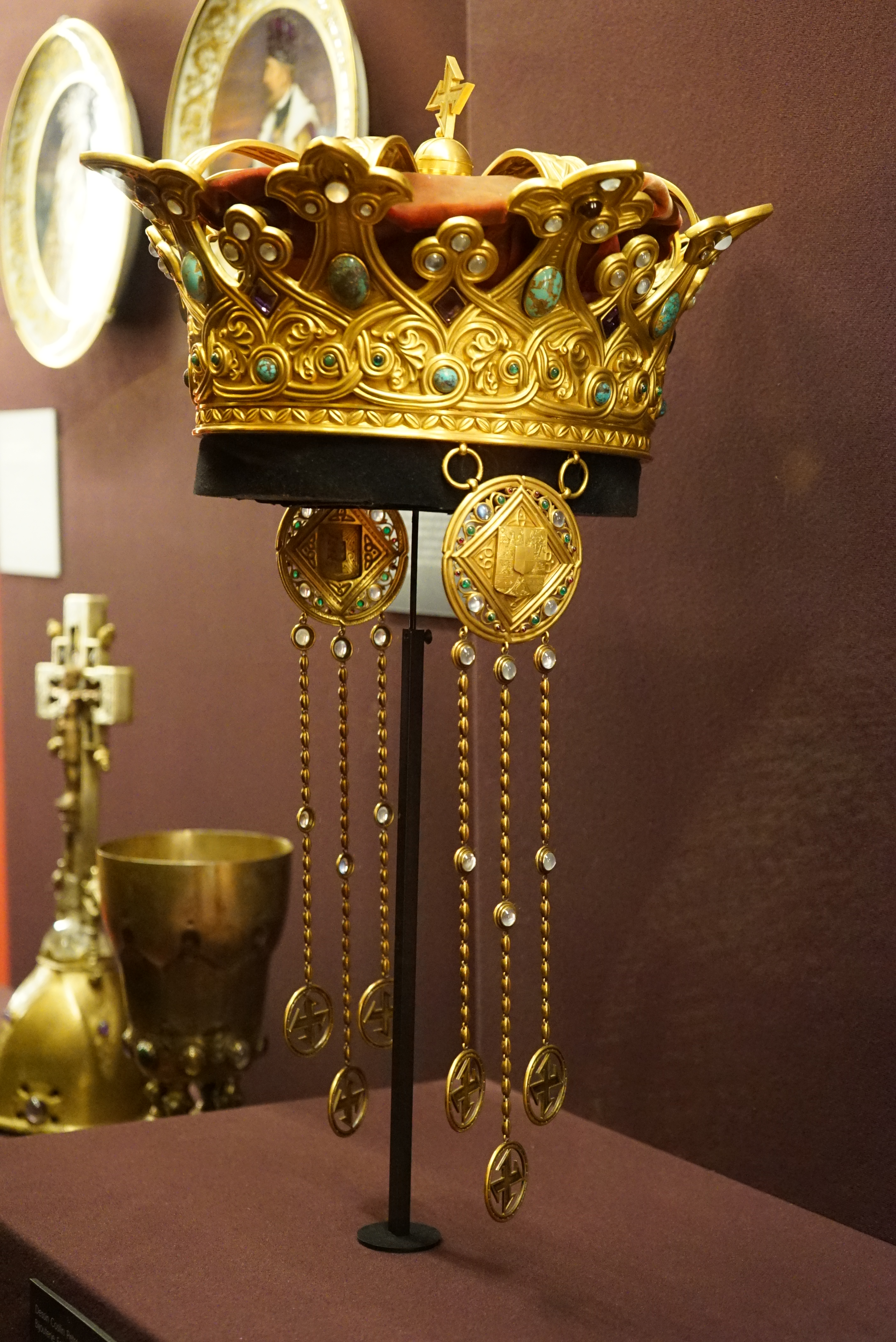
Crown of Queen Marie of Romania

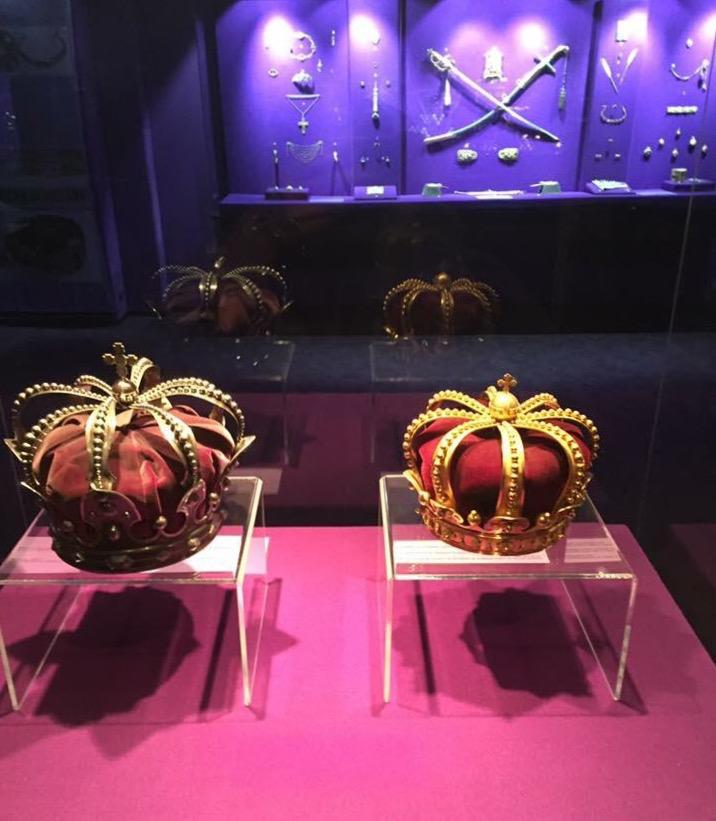
Crowns of Romania

The Romanian Communist dictator Nicolae Ceaușescu also sometimes made use of a scepter in his public appearances.

=== Russia ===
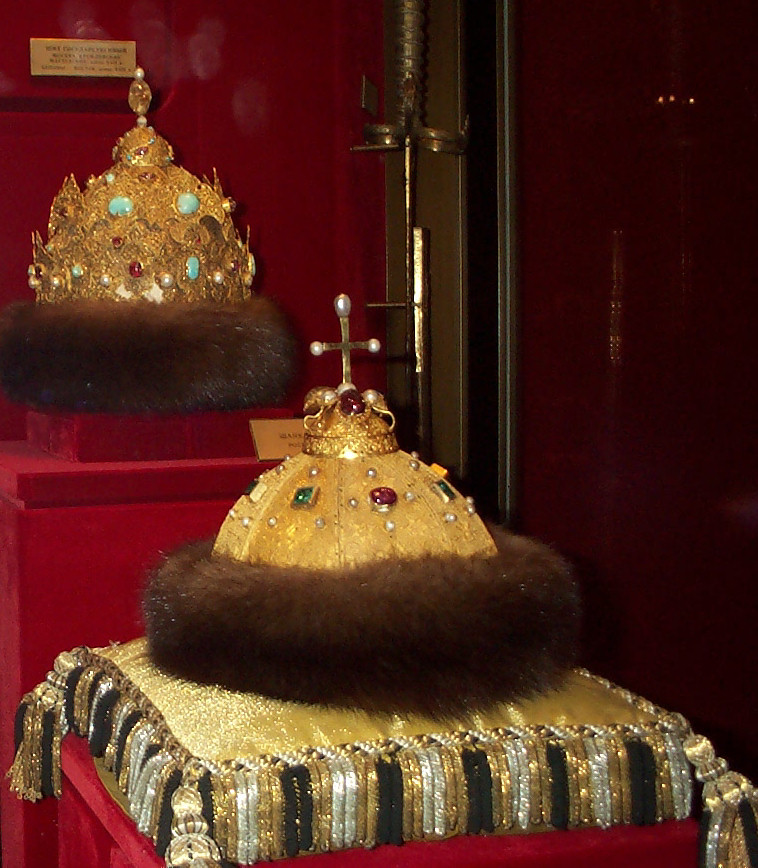
Two oldest Russian crowns: Monomakh's Cap (foreground) and the Kazan Crown

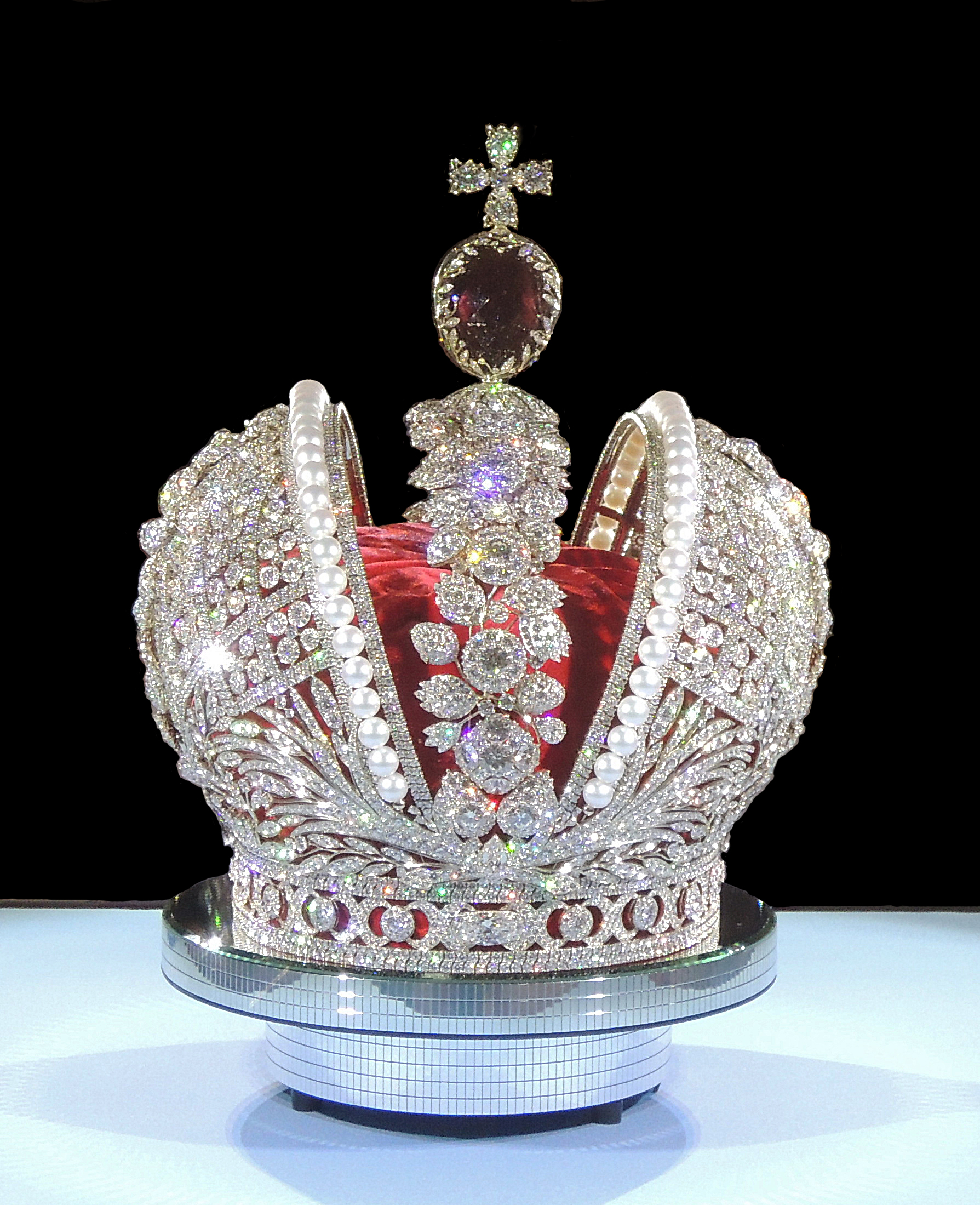
Imperial Crown of Russia

The coronation regalia, such as the Imperial Crown of Russia, the Imperial Orb of Catherine the Great, the Imperial Sceptre with the Orlov Diamond, the Shah Diamond, and others are kept at the Kremlin Armoury and Diamond Fund in Moscow.

=== Serbia ===
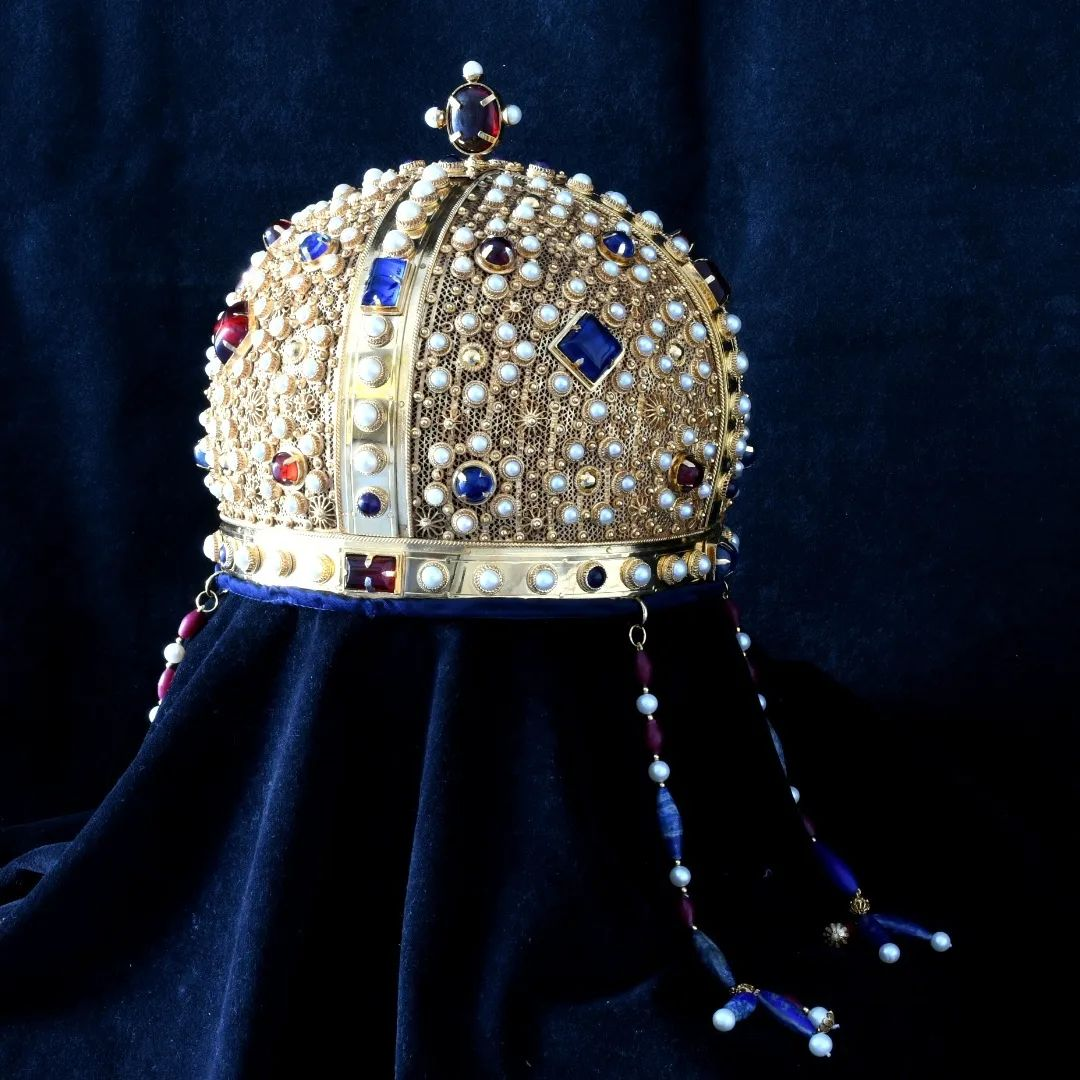
Crown of Emperor Stefan Dušan

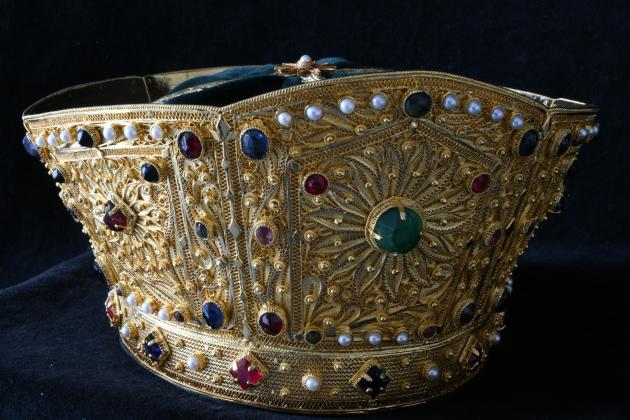
Crown of Despot Stefan Lazarević

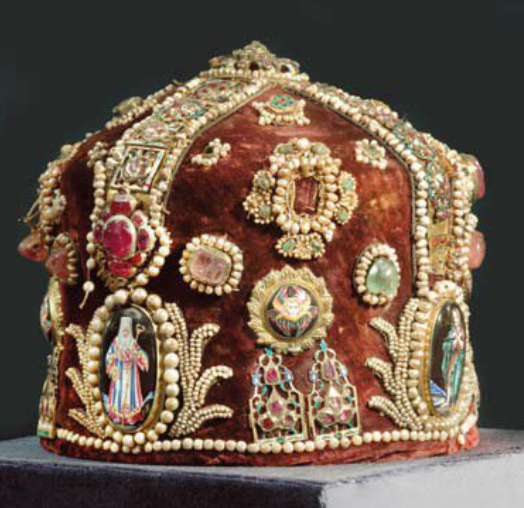
Crown of the Petrović-Njegoš dynasty

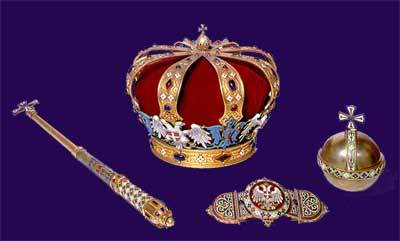
Serbian crown jewels of the Karađorđević dynasty

In Middle Ages, since 10th century Serbia had adopted diverse variants of crowns by Serbian Noble Families and Dynasties like Vojislavljević, Vukanović, Nemanjić, Dejanović, Lazarević, Branković and Mrnjavčević. The crown's peak was during the Serbian empire, led by Emperor of Serbia Stefan Dusan Nemanjic.

The Crown jewels design was influenced by Eastern and Western European Art.

The Karađorđević crown jewels of Serbia were created in 1904 for the coronation of King Peter I. The pieces were made from material that included bronze of Karađorđe's cannon. This gesture was symbolic because 1904 was the 100th anniversary of the First Serbian Uprising. They were made in Paris by the famous Falise brothers jewellery company.

=== Slovenia ===
A document known as "The Swabian Mirror" or Schwabenspiegel (c. 1275) refers to the installation of the dukes of Carantania and in it mentions a crown of sorts called the "Slovenian Hat" (windischer huot). This crown was placed on the head of the duke during the enthronement ceremony. The crown or hat is described as "a grey Slovenian Hat with a grey cord and four leaves suspended from the brim". In 1358 the Habsburg Duke Rudolf IV imparted coats of arms to those provinces without them and ordered the Slovenian Hat to be placed above the arms of the Slovenian March (later called Lower Carniola and now a province of Slovenia).

A crown called the "ducal hat" of Carniola still exists in Graz.

=== Spain ===
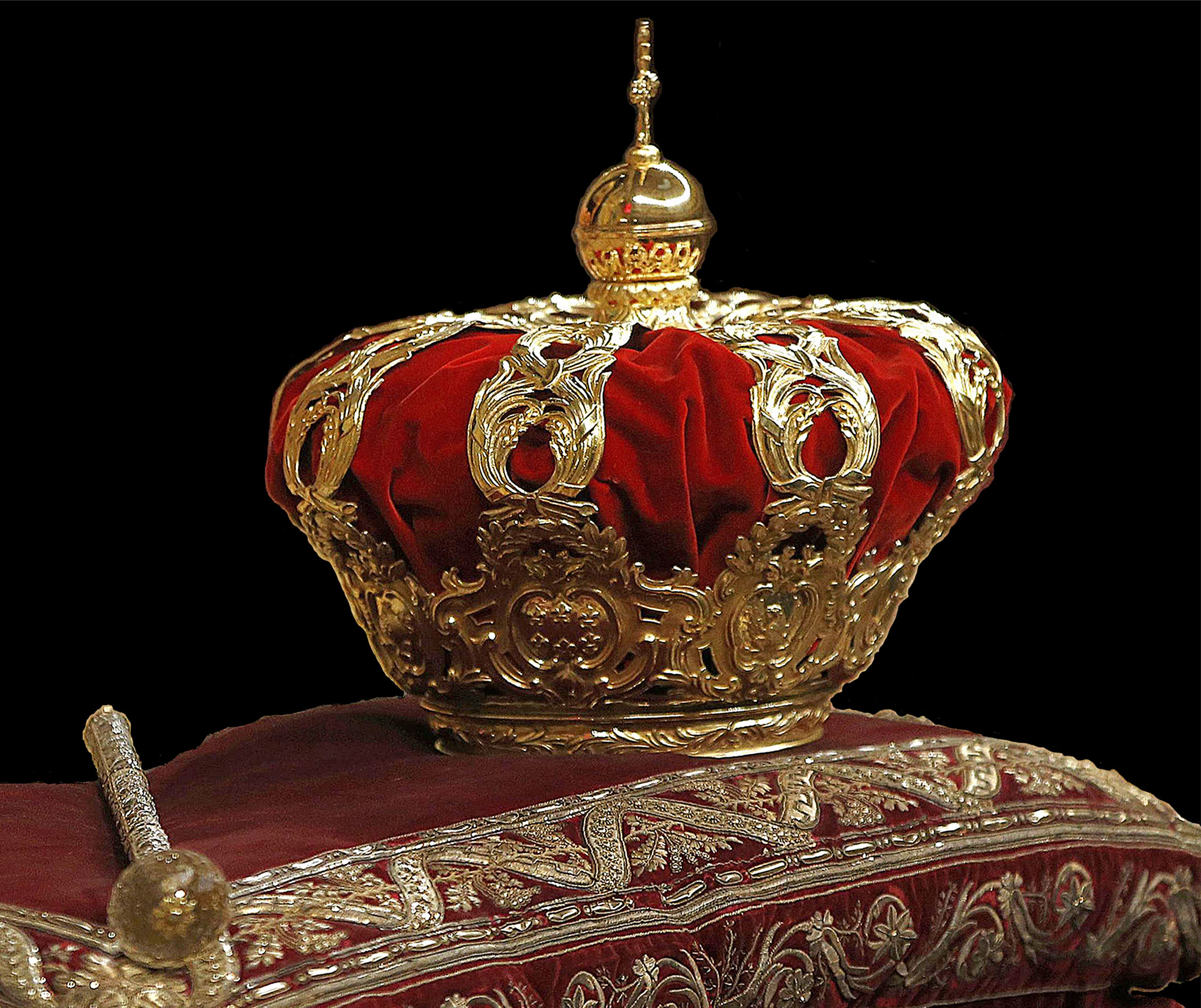
Crown used in the proclamation of Kings of Spain, made in the 18th century

The kingdoms that would consolidate to form Spain during the 15th and 16th centuries, namely the Kingdoms of Castile and Aragon, did not have consistent coronation ceremonies. The last recorded coronation ceremony in what would become Spain occurred in the 15th century; since then, the monarchs were not crowned, but proclaimed. As such, there was decreased importance for a coherent set of crown jewels, as these are usually themselves coronation regalia.

Much of what did exist into the modern era of the regalia of Spain was destroyed in the Great Fire of Madrid of Christmas Eve 1734. In the 18th century, King Charles III ordered a new crown and sceptre to be made. This crown is made of golden silver, and it features half-arches resting on eight plates bearing the emblems of the kingdom. The crown and scepter are displayed during the opening of the Cortes (Parliament). During ceremonies of accession with a new monarch, the crown and scepter are also present, but the crown itself is never placed on the monarch's head. Today they are kept by the Patrimonio Nacional (the National Heritage).

Today, there are other pieces of jewelry and historically important items that would be considered "crown jewels" in other countries but are not denominated as such in Spain. In terms of jewelry, all of the jewels and tiaras worn by the members of the Spanish royal family are privately owned by them. More historically important elements are kept as pieces of cultural interest in different parts of Spain. For example, the personal crown used by Isabella I of Castile, her scepters, and her sword, are kept in the Royal Chapel in the Cathedral of Granada. As a consequence, this means that beyond the crown and scepter used during important occasions of the Spanish state, there is no other element of the crown jewels of Spain.

=== Sweden ===
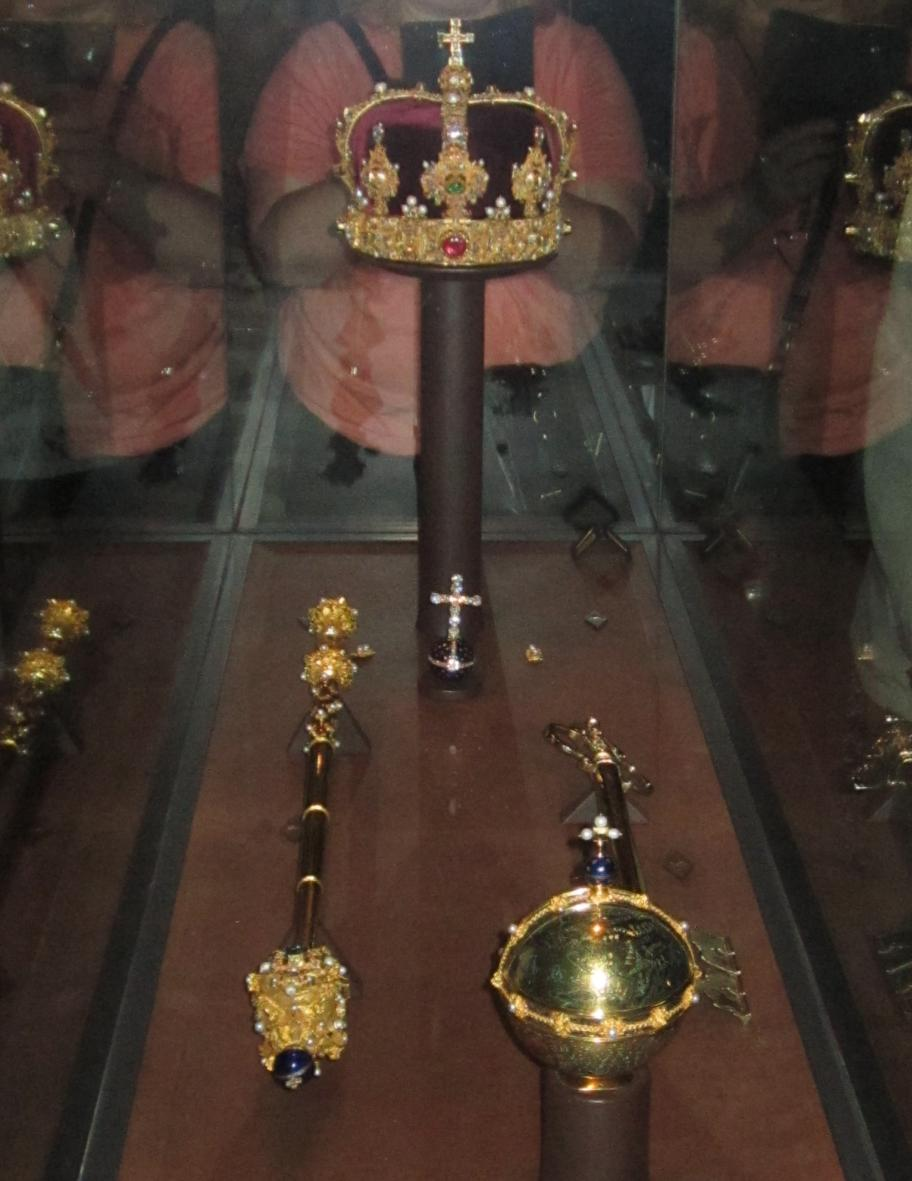
The Crown, Sceptre and Orb of the King of Sweden as displayed in the Royal Treasury (2014).

Sweden's crown jewels are kept deep in the vaults of the Royal Treasury, underneath the Royal Palace in Stockholm, in a museum which is open to the public. The symbols of the Swedish monarchy have not actually been worn since 1907, but are still displayed at weddings, christenings and funerals. Until 1974 the crown jewels were also displayed at the opening of the Riksdag (Parliament). Among the oldest objects are the sword of Gustav Vasa and the crown, orb, sceptre and key of King Erik XIV and numerous other sovereigns.

=== Ukraine ===
Crown of Galicia–Volhynia, presented to Daniel of Galicia by Innocent IV, is believed to have been lost.

=== United Kingdom of Great Britain and Northern Ireland ===
==== England ====
The crown jewels of England, now of the United Kingdom, are kept in the Tower of London. Apart from a 12th-century anointing spoon and three early 17th-century swords, they all date from after the Restoration of Charles II in 1660. The ancient crown jewels of England were destroyed by Oliver Cromwell in 1649 when he established the Commonwealth of England. St Edward's Crown is the centrepiece of the coronation regalia, used at the moment of crowning and exchanged for the lighter Imperial State Crown, which is also worn at State Openings of Parliament. Among the precious stones on the crown are Cullinan II, the Stuart Sapphire, St Edward's Sapphire, and the Black Prince's Ruby (a spinel). On the Sovereign's Sceptre with Cross is Cullinan I, the largest clear cut diamond in the world. Wives of kings are crowned as Queen Consort with a plainer set of regalia. The Crown of Queen Elizabeth The Queen Mother houses the 105-carat Koh-i-Noor diamond. In addition to crowns there are also various orbs, swords, coronets, rings and other pieces of regalia.

==== Scotland ====
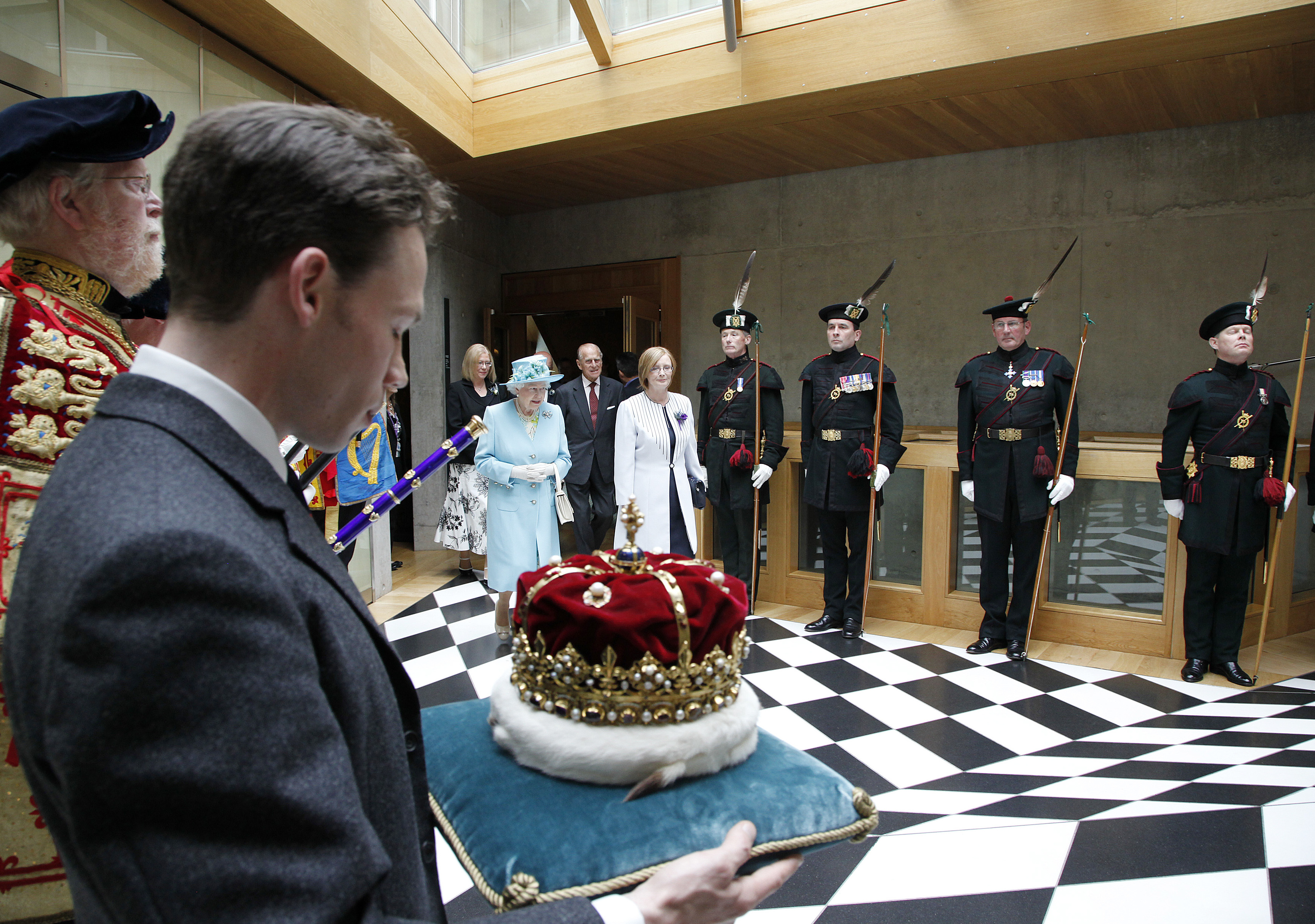
The Crown of Scotland is carried by The Duke of Hamilton as Queen Elizabeth II attends The Scottish Parliament.

The Honours, or 'crown jewels', including the Stone of Scone, are kept in Edinburgh Castle. They are the oldest surviving crown jewels in the United Kingdom. The crown dates from at least 1540 and the sceptre and the sword were gifts by Pope Alexander VI and Pope Julius II respectively to the King of Scotland in the 15th and 16th centuries. They were hidden during the Interregnum. The Honours of Scotland were almost forgotten following their last use at the coronation of Charles II in 1651 until they were discovered in a chest inside Edinburgh Castle in the early 19th century.

A 'golden royal crown' pre-dating the existing 'Honours' had been in existence. It is recorded that it was seized by the English authorities following a search of the luggage of the deposed John Balliol as he attempted to leave England and make his way to exile in France following his release from imprisonment in London in 1299. This crown was sent to King Edward I in London where it was probably placed with the English crown jewels at Westminster Abbey. The later fate of this crown is not entirely clear, but it may have been returned to Scotland during the negotiations between Robert I of Scotland and Edward II of England (following the English defeat at Bannockburn in 1314) or perhaps was returned to Scotland for use in the coronation of Edward Balliol when he was installed as king of Scots by England in 1332. Nevertheless, it is not in existence today.

==== Wales ====
The original regalia of the Welsh princes have been lost. Llywelyn's coronet was kept after its capture with the English crown jewels between 1284 and 1649.

=== The Vatican ===
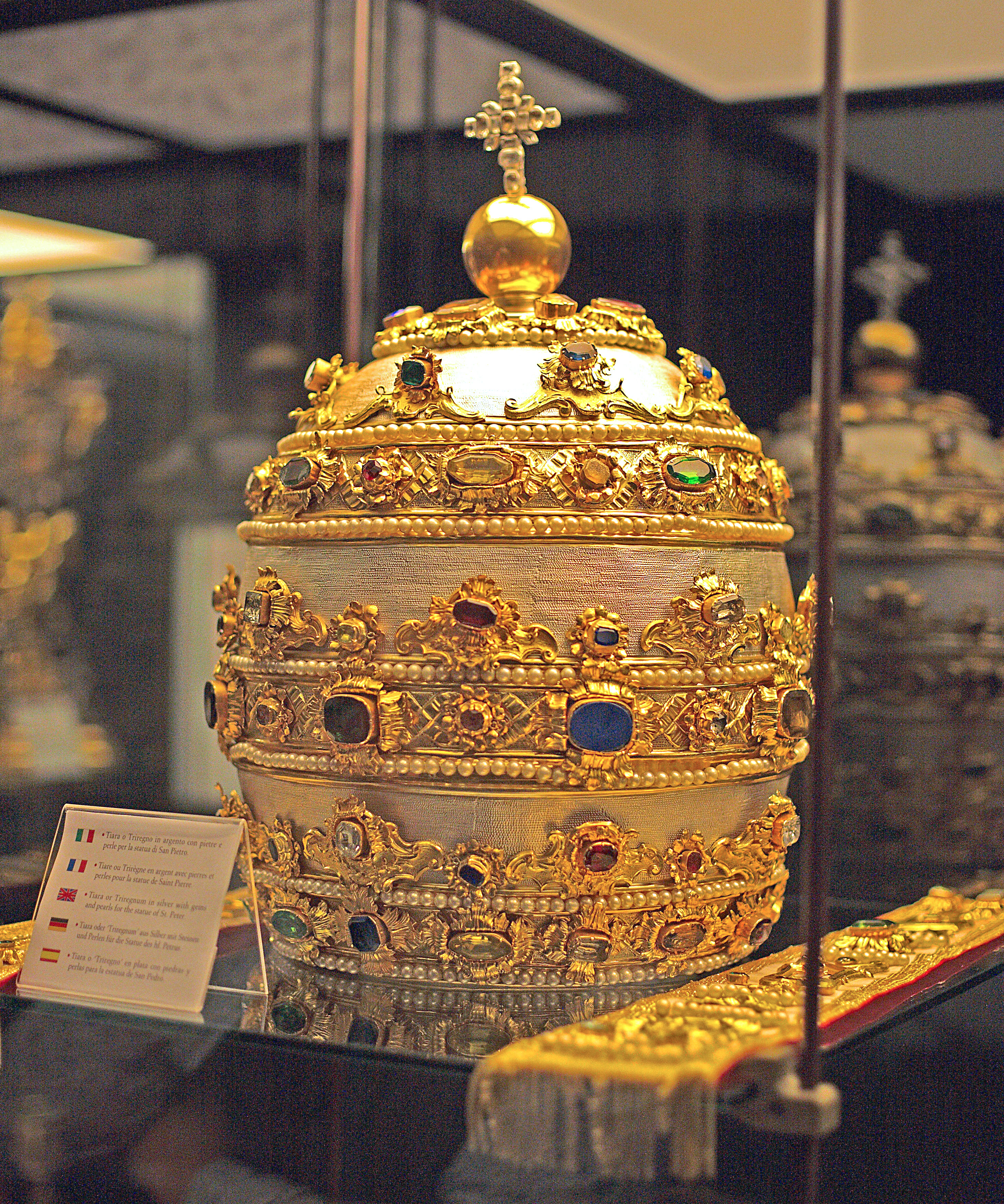
A papal tiara adorned with sapphires, rubies, emeralds and other gems. Saint Peter's Basilica, Rome.

The regalia of the papacy are kept in the Vatican City. For further Information, see Papal regalia and insignia.

- The triregnum is a headgear with three crowns or levels, also called the triple tiara or triple crown. "Tiara" is the name of the headdress, even in the forms it had before a third crown was added to it. For several centuries, popes wore it during processions, as when entering or leaving Saint Peter's Basilica, but during liturgies they used an episcopal mitre instead. Paul VI used it on 30 June 1963 at his coronation, but abandoned its use later. None of his successors have used it.
- The Ring of the Fisherman, another item of papal regalia, is a gold ring decorated with a depiction of St. Peter in a boat casting his net, with the name of the reigning pope surrounding it.
- The papal ferula, a staff topped by a crucifix, is the staff used by the pope.

== The Americas ==
=== Brazil (Empire of Brazil) ===
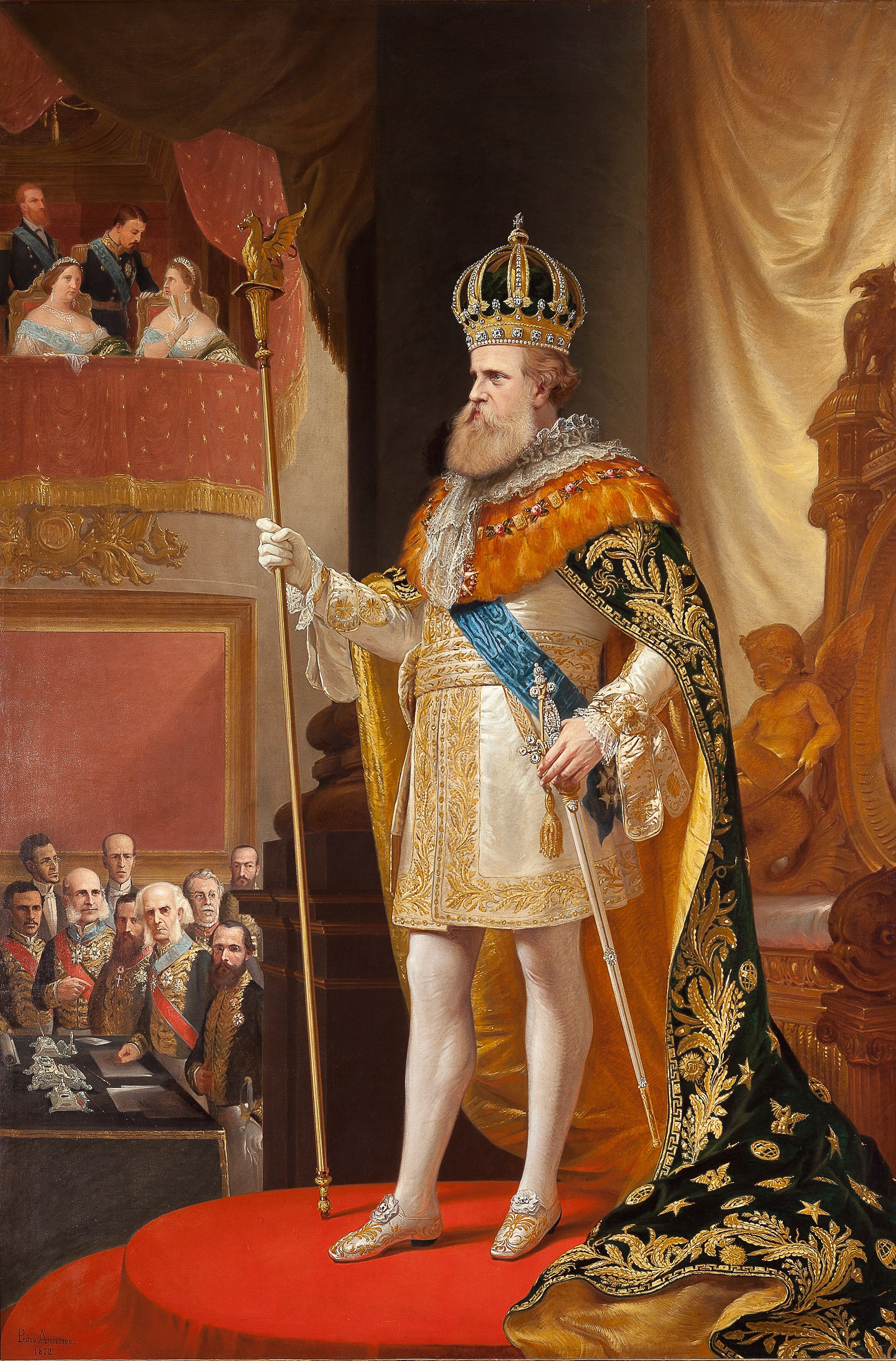
Emperor Pedro II and the Brazilian Imperial Regalia

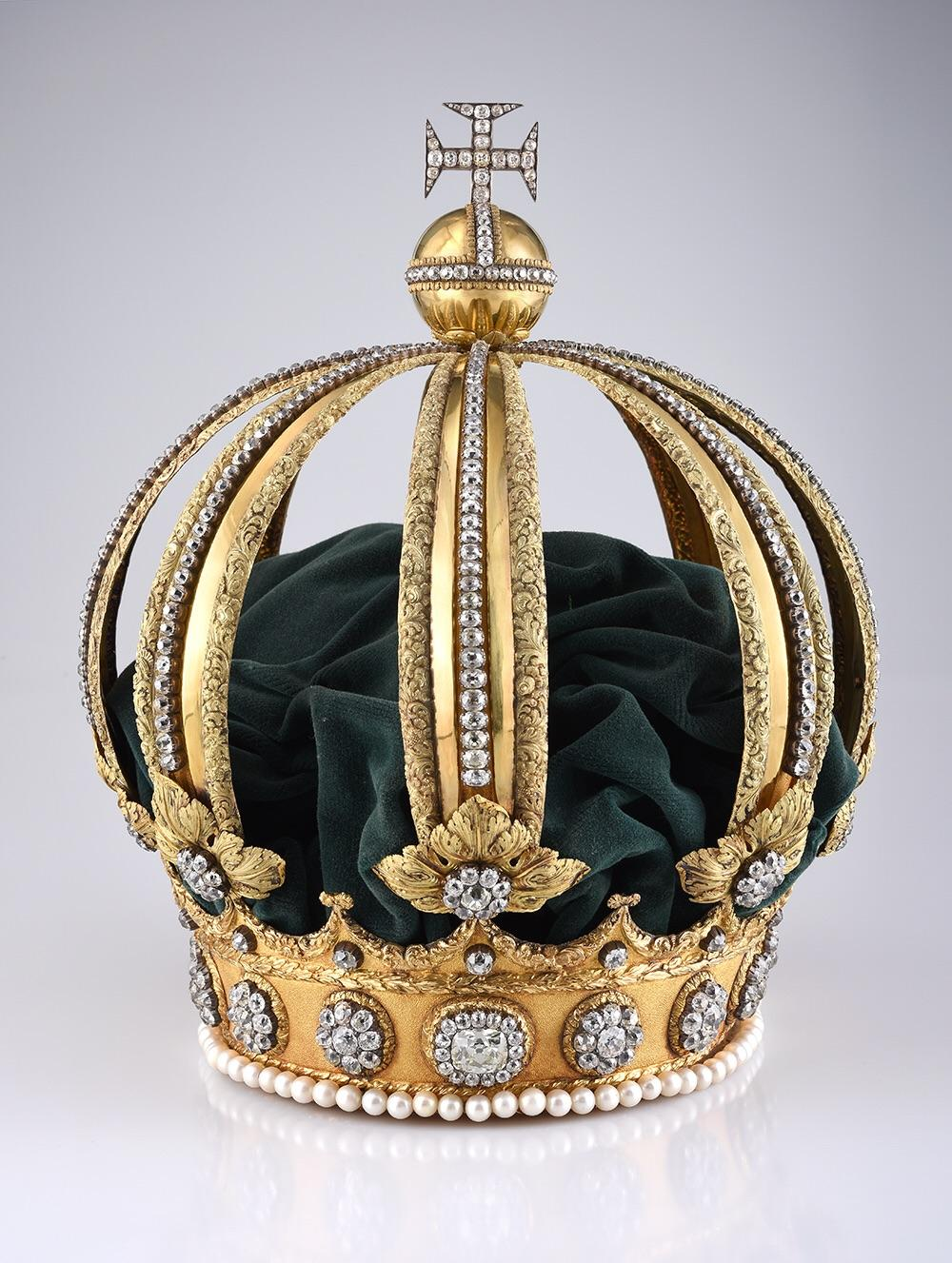
Imperial Crown of Brazil at the Imperial Museum

The Imperial Crown of Brazil along with other regalia and mementos of the Brazilian Empire are kept at the Imperial Museum of Brazil (Museu Imperial) in the former summer palace of Brazilian emperor Pedro II, in Petrópolis, Brazil. Some pieces are also owned by the jewellery collector Aimée de Heeren, former mistress of President Getúlio Vargas.

=== Chile ===
The Kingdom of Araucania and Patagonia has a crown, presented to Prince Philippe of Araucania in 1986 by a group of Araucanian nobles. Previously, the Royal House had no crown. Made of steel and containing stones from the Biobío River, it is on display at the Museum of the Kings of Araucania, outside the village of Chourgnac d'Ans, Dordogne, France.

=== Haiti (Empire of Haiti) ===
Emperor Faustin I wearing his relagia

=== Mexico ===
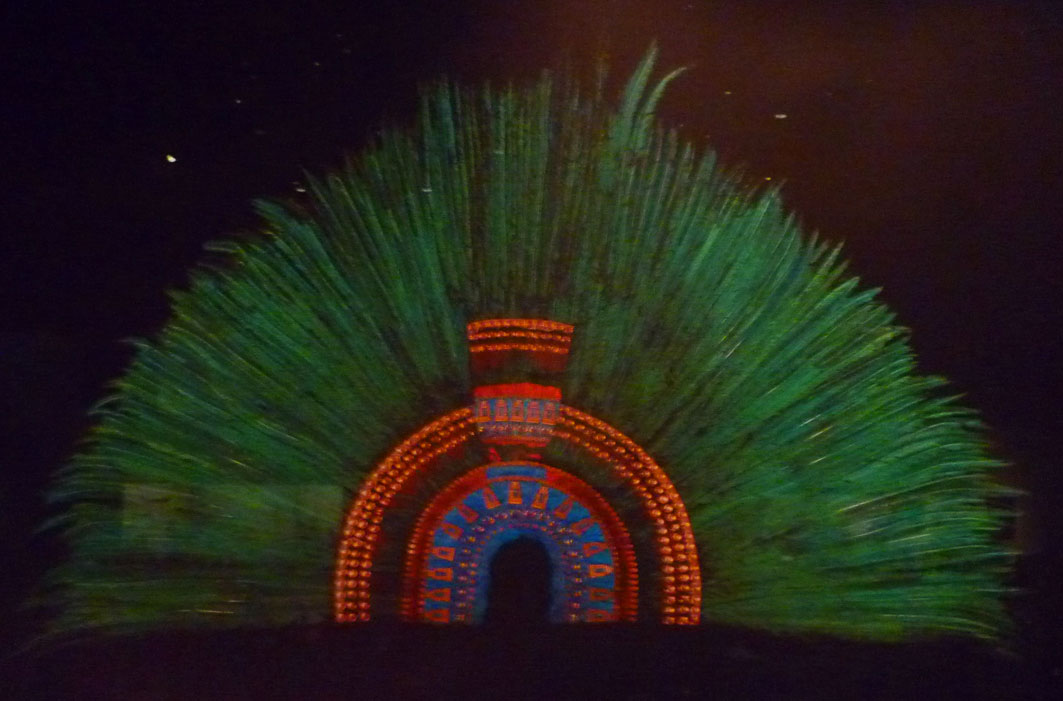
Headdress of Moctezuma II, preserved in Vienna

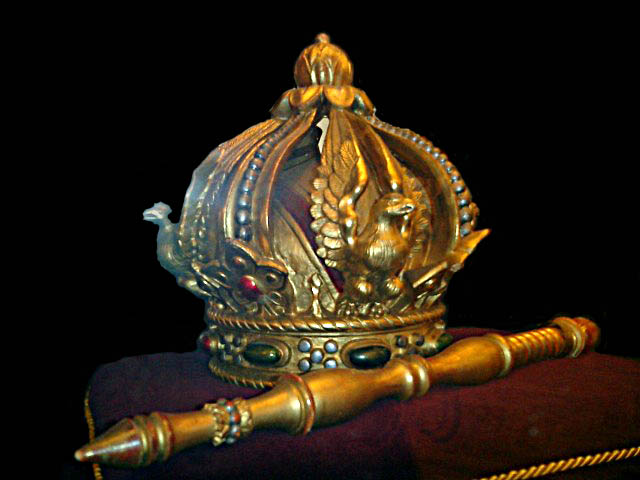
Replica of the Imperial Crown of Mexico (Second Empire)

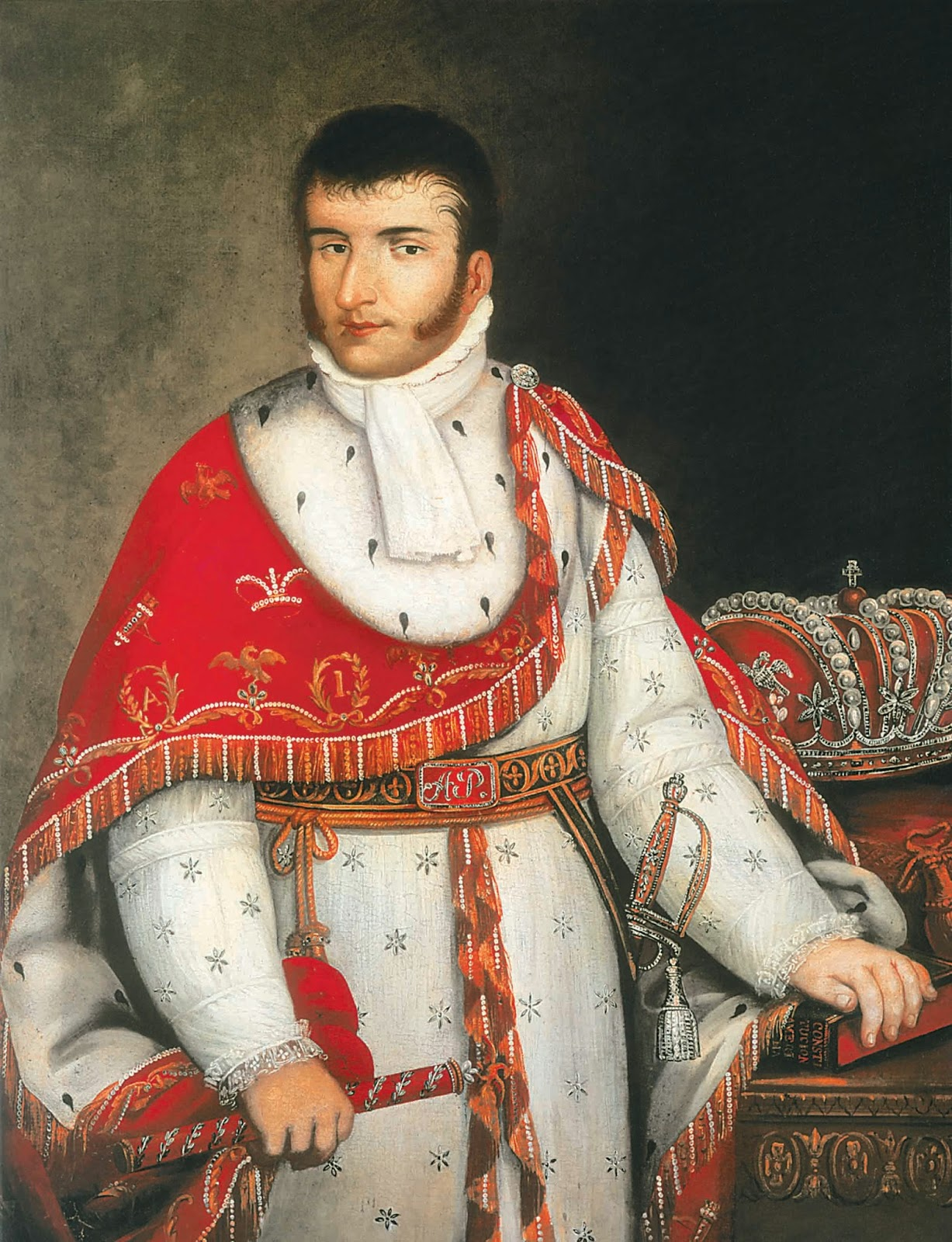
Portrait of Agustín de Iturbide by Josephus Arias Huerta

Prior to the Spanish conquest (1519–1522) most of present-day Mexico formed the Aztec Empire, a Native American empire ruled from Tenochtitlán (present day Mexico City) by a tlatoani or "emperor". The ceremonial feathered headdress or quetzalāpanecayōtl that was worn by Montezuma II (the last reigning emperor) was seized by the Spanish Conquistadors in c. 1520 and sent back to Charles V, Holy Roman Emperor and King of Spain as a gift. Remarkably, it still survives and Montezuma's headdress can be seen at the Museum of Ethnology, Vienna (inventory number 10402VO) along with other ancient Mexican artifacts.

Setting aside the artifacts of Aztec and Spanish rule, there are also extant remnants of the imperial regalia of the First Mexican Empire and Second Mexican Empire.

== Oceania ==
=== Australia ===
As a member of the Commonwealth of Nations, Australia's crown jewels are those in the collection of the Crown Jewels of the United Kingdom. The government of the Commonwealth of Australia at the behest of Prime Minister Robert Menzies, together with those of the United Kingdom, Canada, New Zealand, South Africa, Pakistan, Ceylon, and Southern Rhodesia, presented to Elizabeth II a pair of armills for her 1953 coronation, to replace those made in 1661 for the coronation of Charles II. They remain a part of the crown jewels of the monarch of Australia and the other Commonwealth realms.

=== Hawaii ===
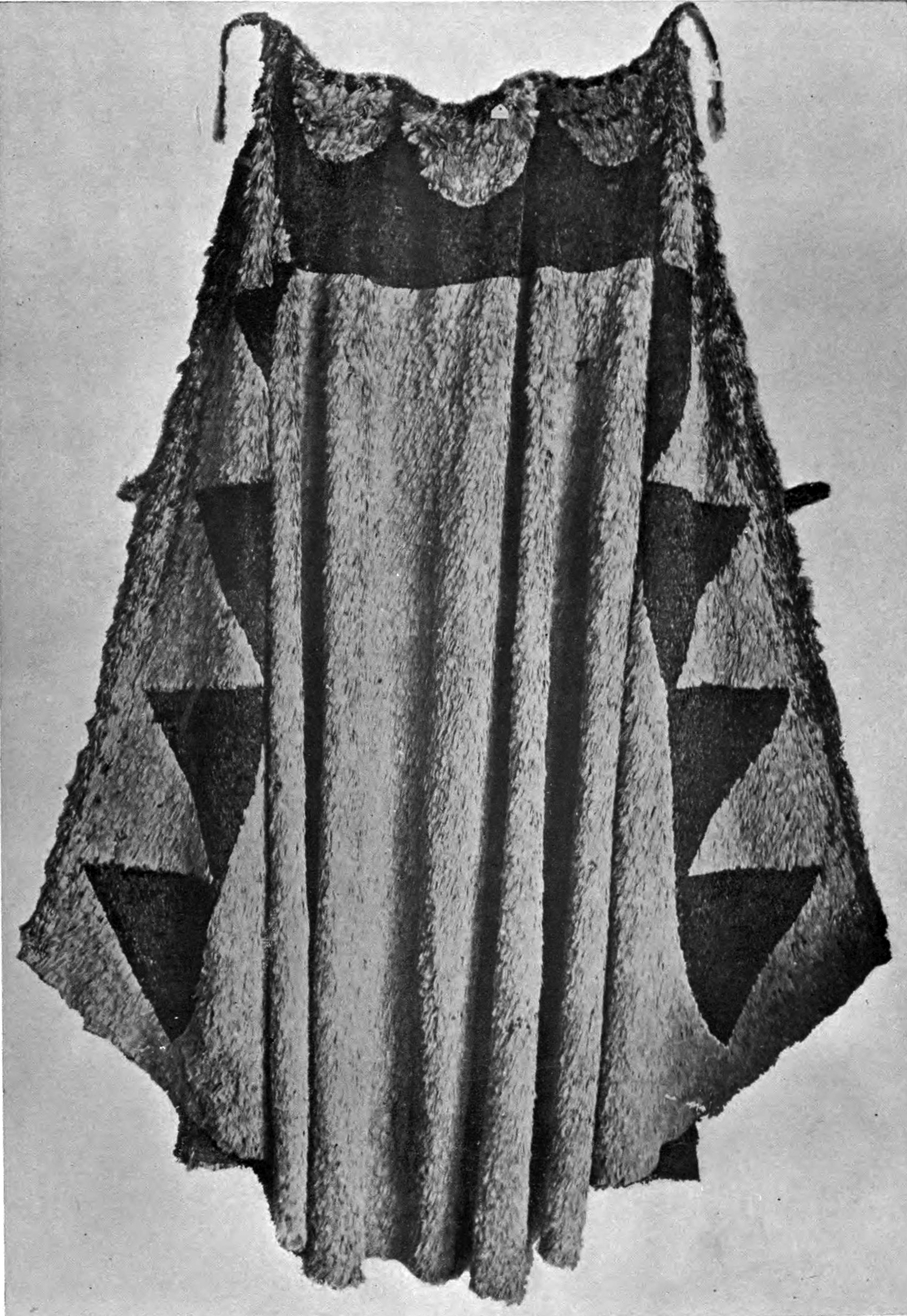
Kīwalaʻō's feathers cloak

Some of the crown jewels and the original thrones of the Kingdom of Hawaii reside within the custody of the Bishop Museum. The King's crown is owned by the State of Hawaii. All are currently on display in the throne room at Iolani Palace.

The two royals crowns were ordered from England in 1883 during Kalakaua's coronation. Worn once and only by Kalakaua and his Queen Kapiolani, they were damaged by looters during the overthrow but later restored and replace with glass jewels. An earlier crown belonging to the Kamehameha dynasty may have existed. In 1855, missionary Samuel C. Damon, who attended the funeral of Kamehameha III, mentioned "At the foot and in front of the coffin was the Royal Crown, covered with crape, resting upon a velvet cushion" at the foot of the King's casket. This crown was still being stored in the Royal Tomb at Pohukaina when Russian explorer Aleksei Vysheslavtsev visited the coral-house mausoleum during the funeral of John William Pitt Kīnaʻu in 1859. On May 26, 1861, Sophia Cracroft, the niece of Lady Franklin, also described the crown during a visit to Pohukaina. If there ever was such a crown, it was either interred in the Royal Mausoleum with the last of the Kamehameha kings or became lost by 1883. King Lunalilo was buried in 1874 with a silver crown bore by John Mākini Kapena in his funeral procession. This crown was kept in the Lunalilo Mausoleum until 1917 when it was stolen by two robbers named Albert Gerbode and Paul Payne from Key West, Florida and subsequently melted into a silver bar. Copies of the thrones can be seen at Iolani Palace. Some of the crown jewels lie in state with the royals at the Royal Mausoleum at Mauna Ala. Feather cloak and wear are among the oldest of Hawaiian regalias: Nāhiʻenaʻena's Pāʻū, the 180 feather skirt of Nāhiʻenaʻena and later the funeral attire for the dead monarch while lying in state; Kamehameha's Cloak, the war-cloak of Kamehameha I made entirely of the golden-yellow feathers of the now-extinct mamo, which was used to drape the throne of the King when it wasn't being worn; Kīwalaʻō's Cloak, a.k.a. the Queen's Cloak, the cloak won by Kamehameha during his battle with Kiwalao, and used to drape the throne of the Queen; and Liloa's Kaei, the feather belt of Liloa, the 14th-century King of Hawaii. Also the Kiha-pu or the War Trumpet (Conch Shell) of Kihanuilulumoku which is one generation older than Liloa's Kaei.

=== New Zealand ===
Kīngitanga is an unofficial kingdom, but one that has become an important one to the Māori people today. The current monarch is Tūheitia Paki. The crown regalia consists of a type of cloak, known to Māori as a korowai, and 'crowning' ceremonies are performed by holding a bible over the new monarch's head.

=== Tahiti ===
The Kingdom of Tahiti had a crown. The crown was a gift from the London Missionary Society to King Pōmare III for his coronation in 1824. The original is housed in the "Musée de Tahiti et des Îles" in Punaauia.

=== Tonga ===
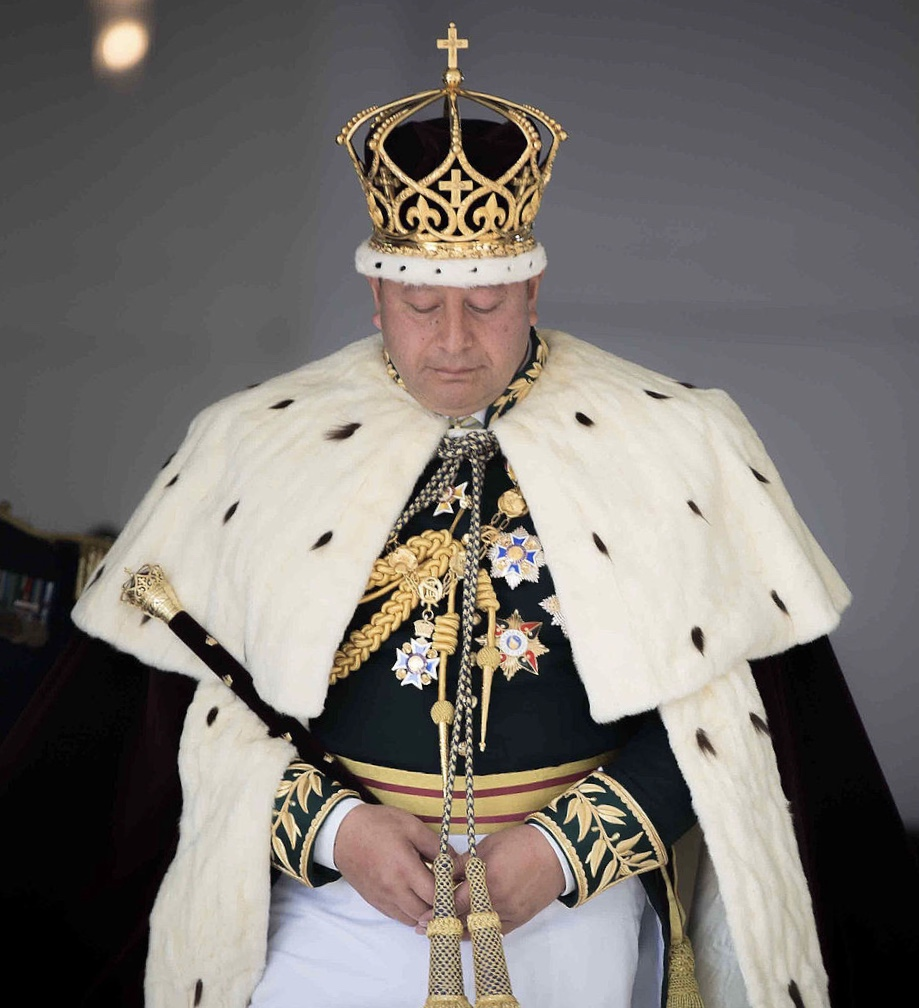
King Tupou VI wearing the Crown of Tonga following his coronation in 2015.

The Crown of Tonga was made in 1873 for George Tupou I at the behest of his prime minister, The Reverend Shirley Waldemar Baker. The crown was fashioned by the jewellery firm of Hardy Brothers of Sydney, Australia. The gold crown of Tonga is reputedly the largest and heaviest crown in the world.

== See also ==
- Crown Jewel Defense – a strategy in mergers and acquisitions
