= Nitra =

City in Nitra Region, Slovakia

- City
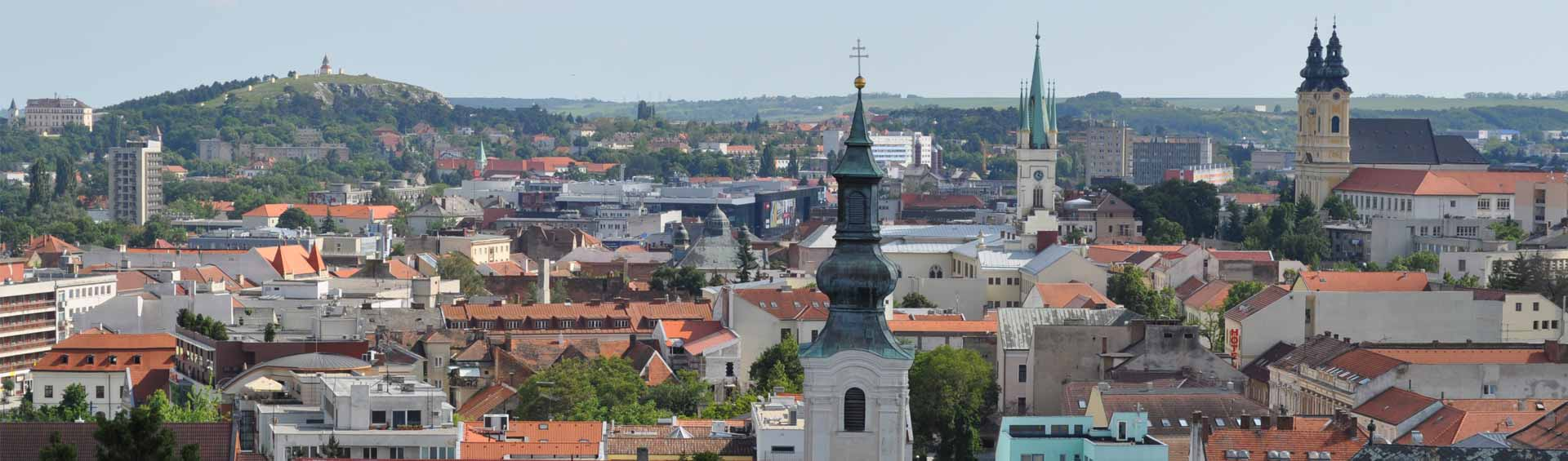
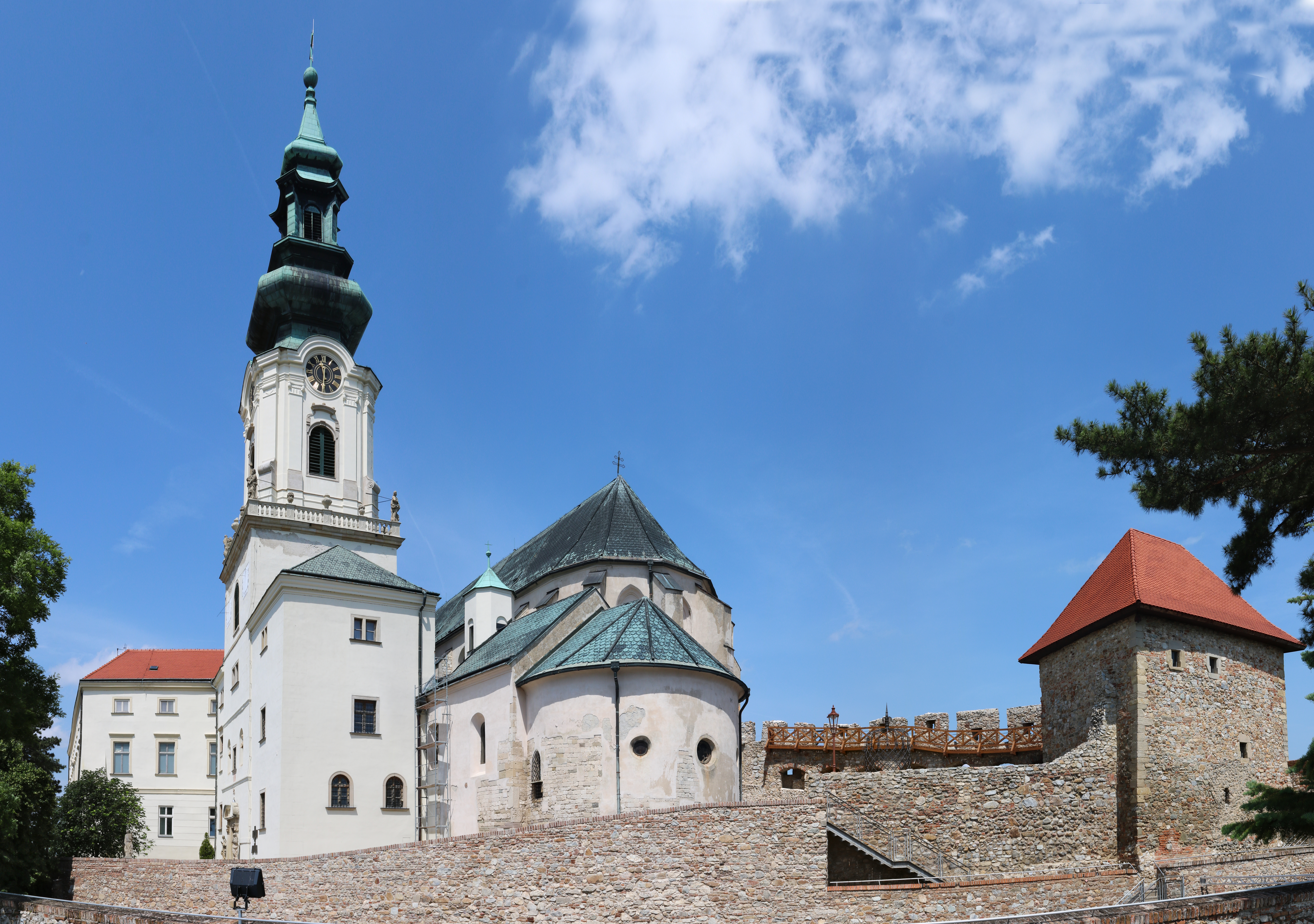
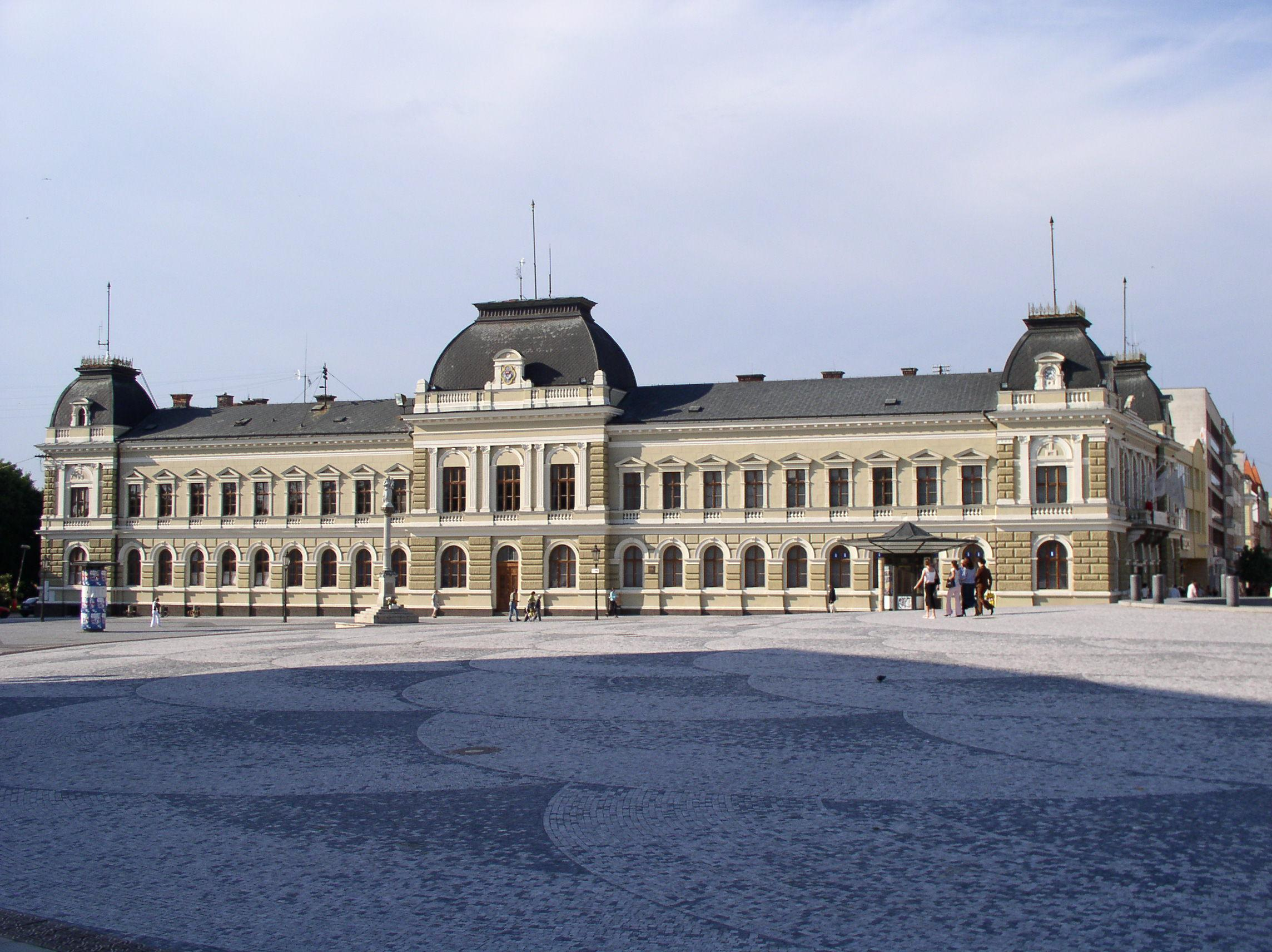
- From the top, Panoramic view of Nitra, St. Emmeram's Cathedral located within the Nitra Castle precinct, Svätopluk Square

- Flag Coat of arms

- Location in Nitra Region Location in Slovakia
- Coordinates: 48°18′25″N 18°05′11″E
- Country: Slovakia
- Region: Nitra Region
- District: Nitra
- First mentioned: 828

Government
  - Mayor: Marek Hattas (Team Nitra Region)

Area
  - Total: 107.97 km^{2} (41.69 sq mi)
- (2022)
- Elevation: 167 m (548 ft)

Population (2025)
  - Total: 75,301
- Demonym(s): Nitrančan (m.); Nitrančanka (f.) (sk)
- Time zone: UTC+1 (CET)
  - Summer (DST): UTC+2 (CEST)
- Postal code: 949 01
- Area code: +421 37
- Vehicle registration plate (until 2022): NR
- Website: nitra.sk

Nitra (Slovak pronunciation: [ˈɲitra]; also known by other alternative names) (Hungarian: Nyitra) is a city in southwestern Slovakia, situated at the foot of the Zobor Mountain in the Nitra River Valley about 90 km (56 mi) northeast of the country's capital, Bratislava. With a population of about 78,353, it is the fifth-largest city in Slovakia. Nitra stands on varied terrain, which features both rolling hills and vast plains, particularly to the south. Nitra is one of the oldest cities in Slovakia. It was the center of the Principality of Nitra, a duchy of great historic significance. Today, the city serves as the administrative center of Nitra Region (kraj) and Nitra District (okres). Nitra is the agricultural capital of Slovakia due to its long tradition of farming, favorable climate, and geography.

== Etymology ==
The first mention of Nitra dates back to the 9th century. The name of the city is derived from the Nitra River. The name is Indo-European, but the question of its pre-Slavic or Slavic origin has not been satisfactorily answered. Nitra might be derived from the old Indo-European root neit-, nit- 'to cut' or 'to burn' using the derivational element -r- (see also slash-and-burn agricultural technique). The same root is still present in the Slovak verb nietiť 'to make a fire', but also in other Indo-European languages like Latin nitere 'to burn' or in German schneiden 'to cut'. Another view of the origin of the name is related to Latin Novi-iter or Neui-iter 'new territory behind the limes'. The hypothetical Latin name could have been adopted by the Quadi and later by the Slavs.

The first written records also contain the suffix -ava (Nitrava). Particularly in older literature, the suffix is interpreted as deriving from the Proto-Germanic root *ahwa 'water'. However, the suffix -ava can also be found in numerous toponyms with a clearly Slavic origin and without any relationship to rivers. The existence of the hydronym Nitrava remains hypothetical and all versions with the suffix are related to a location, not a river. Thus, the form Nitrava can refer to a larger property or territory around the Nitra River. Both forms were probably used concurrently and were already recorded in the 9th century (Conversio Bagoariorum et Carantanorum: in loco vocata Nitraua, but in 880 ecclesie Nitrensis).

The name in different languages includes Latin: Nitria, German: Neutra, and Hungarian: Nyitra and Nyitria.

== History ==
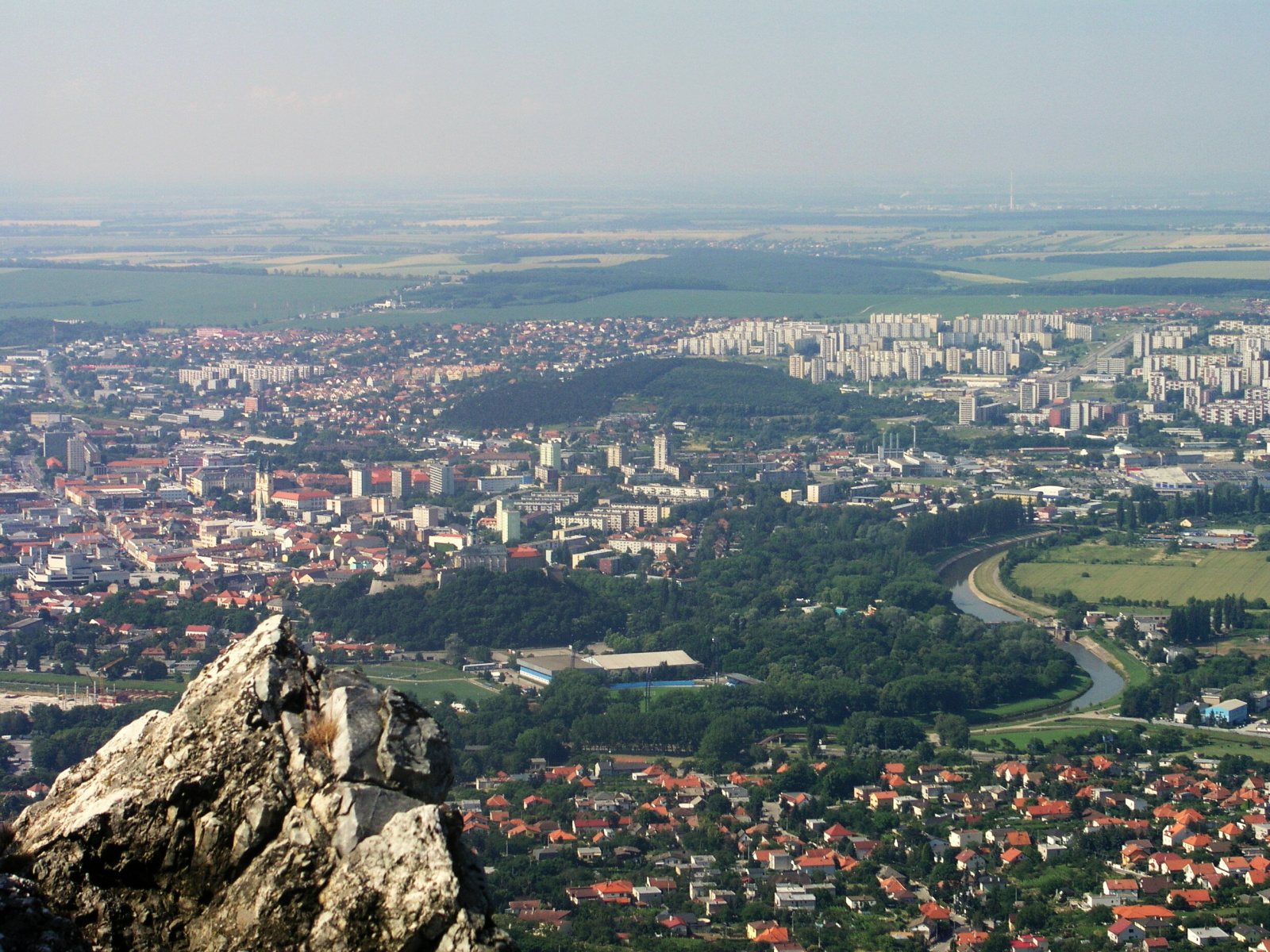
Nitra from Zobor Mountain

=== Before the 5th century ===
The oldest archaeological findings in Nitra are dated to around 25,000-30,000 years ago. The locality has been inhabited in all historical periods in the last 5,000-7,000 years. Several European archaeological cultures and groups were named after important archaeological discoveries in Nitra or its near surroundings - Nitra culture, Brodzany-Nitra group, or Lužianky group of Lengyel culture.

The people of Madarovce culture had built the first fortification on Castle Hill by around 1,600 BCE. In the Iron Age, a large hillfort was built on Zobor Hill and additional smaller hillforts on the Lupka Hill and in Dražovce (700-500 BCE). Several Celtic settlements are known from the 5th-1st centuries. The Celts minted silver tetradrachms known as coins of the Nitra type and probably also built a hillfort in the locality Na Vŕšku. In the Roman period (1st-4th centuries CE), the Germanic tribe of Quadi settled in the area, which is also mentioned as their possible capital (396 CE). The largest Germanic settlement from the migration period in the territory of modern-day Slovakia was unearthed in Nitra-Párovské Háje.

=== 5th to 10th centuries ===
The first Slavs arrived in the territory of present Slovakia at the end of the 5th and early 6th centuries. The early Slavs settled mainly in the lowlands near the water flows; the highest density of their settlements is documented just in the area of Nitra. As the Avars expanded into the territory of modern-day Slovakia in the latter half of the 7th century and early 8th century, the border between Slavic and Slavo-Avaric territory shifted toward Nitra. A biritual cemetery in Nitra-Dolné Krškany lies on the northern border of the mixed settlement area.

The importance of Nitra for the Slavs began to grow in the 8th century, and thereafter it evolved to the administrative centre of the wider region. Nitra became the center of the Principality of Nitra. Three of the eleven extant copies of the Conversio Bagoariorum et Carantanorum contain a reference to a church consecrated for Pribina in his domain called Nitrava. The problem of Pribina's church and the dating of this event was addressed by numerous scholars; most of them do not doubt the reliability of the information and associate this event with Nitra. In 833, Pribina was ousted by the Moravian prince Mojmír I and both regions were united into the early medieval empire of Great Moravia.

In the 9th century, Nitra was one of the largest agglomerations in Central Europe. The agglomeration consisted of fortified centres and more than twenty non-fortified villages. It spread out on a territory exceeding the present town. The Slavs, Slovak ancestors, built a large castle on an area of 8.5 hectares (21 acres). on Castle Hill,. Further important locations, Na vŕšku and Martinský Vrch, were probably also fortified. Other hills, some of them fortified already in prehistoric times, had a guarding and refuge function. Surrounding villages were used as an agricultural hinterland for the princely retinue and for specialised production (jewellery production, forges, pottery kilns, etc.). More than forty burial sites are documented on 20 km (12 mi)^{2}. In all burial sites, exclusively inhumation rite (compliant with Christian belief) was practised, instead of cremation, typical for earlier Slavs. The known necropolises with military equipment around the perimeter of the agglomeration probably belonged to the settlements guarding access roads to the centre.

The city reached its height during the reign of Svätopluk I. During his rule, the first known Christian bishopric in Slovakia was established in Nitra in 880 (with Wiching as the bishop). The question of the origin of the Monastery of St. Hippolytus (the oldest Benedictine Monastery in Kingdom of Hungary) has not been sufficiently answered yet. Even if findings of ceramics documented a settlement in the location, its character is unclear.

=== 10th to 13th centuries ===
The development of Nitra was temporarily slowed down after the disintegration of Great Moravia. However, Nitra did not follow the fate of other prominent Great Moravian centres (Mikulčice-Valy, Pohansko, Staré Město-Uherské Hradište), and until the 13th century it preserved its status as a prestigious centre. According to older assumptions, Nitra should have been occupied by masses of Magyar (Hungarian) units, predictably followed by significant destruction of the previous settlements. However, later archaeological research does not support this theory. The extinction horizon (e.g., destruction by fire) is not documented for any known settlement, and the continuity between the graveyards from different periods remained high. In the 10th century, the settlement structure was not affected by any observable destruction process or significant change in the ethnic composition. The continuity of Slavic settlements and economic infrastructure was preserved. Archaeological evidence pointing to an early presence of Magyars directly in Nitra has not been found yet, except for the warrior grave in Nitra-Mlynárce. Paradoxically, their presence is documented north of Nitra (Čakajovce) and from peripheral areas with more rural character, where they joined the majority Slavic population. Here, their members were buried together with the Slavs in common graveyards. Later, both cultures merged into the common Bijelo Brdo culture, with ethnic-specific attributes fading away.

Political affiliation of the territory in the 10th and the early 11th century is unclear – the influence of the Hungarian Árpáds, the Czech Přemyslids, and the Polish Piasts is being considered. Finally, Nitra became an integral part of the Kingdom of Hungary and the seat of several Árpáds princes. The town survived the invasion of Mongols in 1241. In 1248, Béla IV gave Nitra the privileges of a free royal town. In 1271–1272, Nitra was heavily damaged by the Czech king Ottakar II. The raids also damaged the bishop's property and, therefore, as compensation, Nitra was put under his administration in 1288. The town lost its royal privileges, and in the next centuries, it was unable to recover, mainly because of frequent military conflicts.

=== 14th to 19th centuries ===
In the early 14th century, the town and the castle were damaged several times by Matthew III Csák. In the conflict between the king and oligarchy, the bishop of Nitra remained loyal to the king. In 1313, the king confirmed bishopric privileges and extended them for the right to administer not only Nitra, but the whole Nitra County.

The town became a target of Hussite attacks in the 15th century, at the time defended by Ispán of Nitra county, Stibor of Stiboricz, and later his son Stibor de Beckov. After the Hungarian defeat at the Battle of Mohács in 1526 and subsequent Ottoman advances into the Hungarian territory, Nitra was under threat of Ottoman attacks. In 1563, the town became the seat of the Captaincy of Lower Hungary. The Turkish forces failed to capture the castle three times before they conquered it in 1663. Habsburg troops under Jean-Louis Raduit de Souches recaptured it on 2 May 1664 before the Battle of Léva. The Turks returned at the start of the Great Turkish War and held the town until 1685. The town was also affected by anti-Habsburg uprisings, from Stephen Bocskay and Gabriel Bethlen uprisings in the 17th century to the Kuruc uprisings from 1703 to 1711, and the town burned down in 1708 as a result of fights. It was renovated in the 18th century in the Baroque style. As a consequence of the Revolutions of 1848, Nitra was awarded an independent self-government for the first time since 1288 and became independent from the Diocese of Nitra and its bishops. Still an agricultural and handicraft town, Nitra started to industrialize. Before World War I, a distillery, an agricultural machinery factory, a brewery, a dairy, and other works were established. The first indirect connection to a railway was a road built in 1850 to the closest station in Trnovec nad Váhom. The railway arrived in Nitra in 1876, when a connection from Šurany was built. Later, lines were built to Topoľčany, Hlohovec and Nové Zámky. As a part of Magyarization, from 1883 to 1919, Nitra was the seat of the Upper Hungarian Teaching Association (FEMKE), a government-sponsored association whose main goal was to apply Magyarization policies on Slovaks.

=== 20th to 21st centuries ===
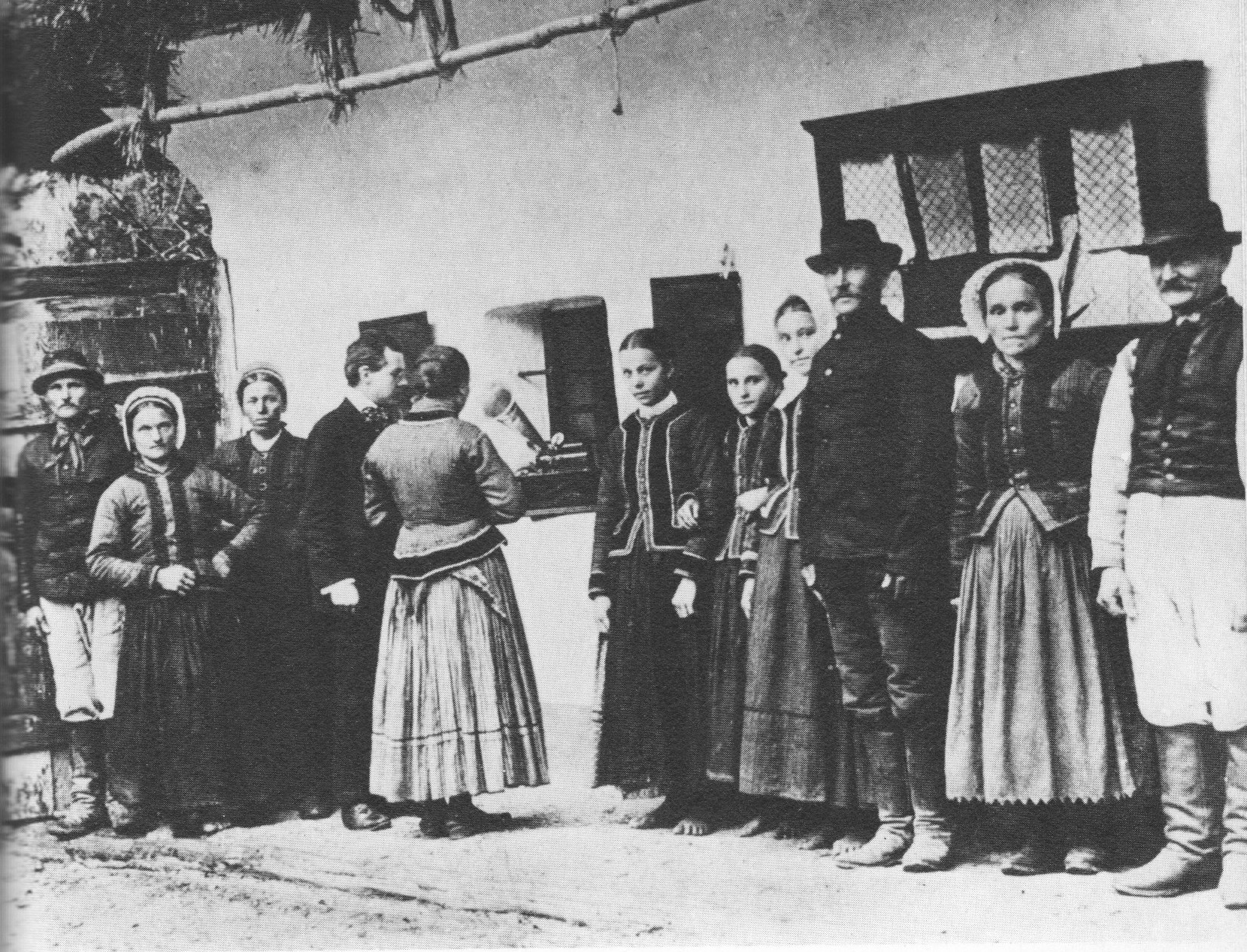
Folk singers in Nitra, 1907

After World War I and in the atmosphere of postwar chaos and rising anarchy, the Hungarian National Council in Nitra decided to negotiate with the Czechoslovak Army, pushing out Hungarian military forces and police from the territory of present Slovakia. The Hungarian National Council and the Town Council needed the Czechoslovak Army to restore public order, but hoped that the situation was only temporary and formally protested against the "occupation" on 10 December 1918. However, the town became a part of Czechoslovakia. Nitra continued to be the seat of the Nitra county until it was dissolved in 1928. In 1933, Nitra played an important role in the Slovak autonomist movement when Pribina's Celebration (the anniversary of the consecration of the first Christian church) turned into the largest demonstration against Czechoslovakism.

After the break-up of Czechoslovakia in 1939, Nitra became a part of the First Slovak Republic and once again a seat of Nitra county until 1945. The period of the First Slovak Republic was tragic for the Jewish population of Nitra, which was first victimized by the anti-Jewish law and then mostly exterminated in German concentration camps (90% of Jewish citizens). The city was liberated by the Soviet Red Army in 1945, for only three years of restored democracy in Czechoslovakia.

Slovak historians believe that Nitra is the location of the oldest Slovak Jewish community.

The Communist period from 1948 to 1989 was marked by the oppression of the Catholic church, which had traditionally had a strong presence in Nitra. Catholic seminaries, monasteries, and other properties were nationalized and converted to museums, schools, and offices. This period experienced extensive growth, the building of housing projects, and the annexation of formerly independent villages. After the Velvet Revolution of 1989 and dissolution of Czechoslovakia, Nitra became part of newly established Slovakia and became the seat of the Nitra Region in 1996.

In 2008, the remains of Jozef Tiso—the controversial leader of the First Slovak Republic who collaborated with the Nazis and was executed in 1947 as a war criminal—were exhumed from a Bratislava cemetery and reburied in the canonical crypt of the Catholic Cathedral in Nitra.

== Geography ==
=== Topography ===
The municipality lies at an altitude of 167 metres (548 ft) and covers an area of 107.97 km^{2} (41.69 sq mi) (2025). It is located in the Nitra River valley in the Danubian Lowland, where the bigger part of the city is located. A smaller part is located at the southernmost reaches of the Tribeč mountains, more precisely at the foothill of the Zobor mountain 587 metres (1,926 ft). It is around halfway between Slovak capital Bratislava, 92 kilometres (57 mi) away and central Slovak city of Banská Bystrica, 118 kilometres (73 mi) away. Other towns in the surroundings include Trnava to the west (53 km), Topoľčany to the north (35 km), Levice to the east (42 km), and Nové Zámky (37 km) and Komárno (71 km) to the south. A national natural reservation called Zoborská lesostep is located within the city's boundaries.

=== Climate ===
Nitra lies in the humid continental climate with four distinct seasons bordering a temperate climate. It is characterized by a significant variation between hot summers and cold, snowy winters. The city is located in the warmest and driest part of Slovakia.

Climate data for Nitra (1991−2020)
Month	Jan	Feb	Mar	Apr	May	Jun	Jul	Aug	Sep	Oct	Nov	Dec	Year
Record high °C (°F)	17.0 (62.6)	19.5 (67.1)	23.1 (73.6)	30.6 (87.1)	32.4 (90.3)	36.2 (97.2)	38.6 (101.5)	39.0 (102.2)	33.4 (92.1)	28.2 (82.8)	21.4 (70.5)	15.5 (59.9)	39.0 (102.2)
Mean daily maximum °C (°F)	2.6 (36.7)	5.4 (41.7)	11.0 (51.8)	17.6 (63.7)	21.9 (71.4)	25.7 (78.3)	28.0 (82.4)	27.7 (81.9)	22.2 (72.0)	15.7 (60.3)	9.0 (48.2)	3.3 (37.9)	15.8 (60.4)
Daily mean °C (°F)	−0.5 (31.1)	1.3 (34.3)	5.5 (41.9)	11.4 (52.5)	16.0 (60.8)	19.6 (67.3)	21.7 (71.1)	21.1 (70.0)	15.9 (60.6)	10.4 (50.7)	5.6 (42.1)	0.7 (33.3)	10.7 (51.3)
Mean daily minimum °C (°F)	−3.8 (25.2)	−2.6 (27.3)	0.6 (33.1)	5.0 (41.0)	9.5 (49.1)	13.0 (55.4)	14.6 (58.3)	14.6 (58.3)	10.3 (50.5)	5.9 (42.6)	2.3 (36.1)	−2.1 (28.2)	5.6 (42.1)
Record low °C (°F)	−23.8 (−10.8)	−19.9 (−3.8)	−13.3 (8.1)	−6.9 (19.6)	−3.0 (26.6)	3.4 (38.1)	5.0 (41.0)	5.2 (41.4)	0.2 (32.4)	−9.3 (15.3)	−11.7 (10.9)	−20.5 (−4.9)	−23.8 (−10.8)
Average precipitation mm (inches)	32.8 (1.29)	28.9 (1.14)	32.9 (1.30)	36.3 (1.43)	59.3 (2.33)	59.1 (2.33)	64.6 (2.54)	54.6 (2.15)	58.1 (2.29)	46.1 (1.81)	44.9 (1.77)	41.6 (1.64)	559.2 (22.02)
Average precipitation days (≥ 1.0 mm)	6.9	6.5	6.2	5.7	8.0	7.3	7.2	6.4	6.4	6.5	8.0	7.1	82.2
Average snowy days	9.9	7.2	4.3	0.7	0.0	0.0	0.0	0.0	0.0	0.2	3.5	7.5	33.2
Average relative humidity (%)	82.5	79.1	69.9	62.5	64.3	65.2	62.1	65.0	70.2	74.4	81.7	86.2	71.9
Mean monthly sunshine hours	63.7	103.2	158.1	222.6	263.2	273.7	289.7	283.5	196.4	140.8	73.0	51.8	2,119.7
Source: NOAA

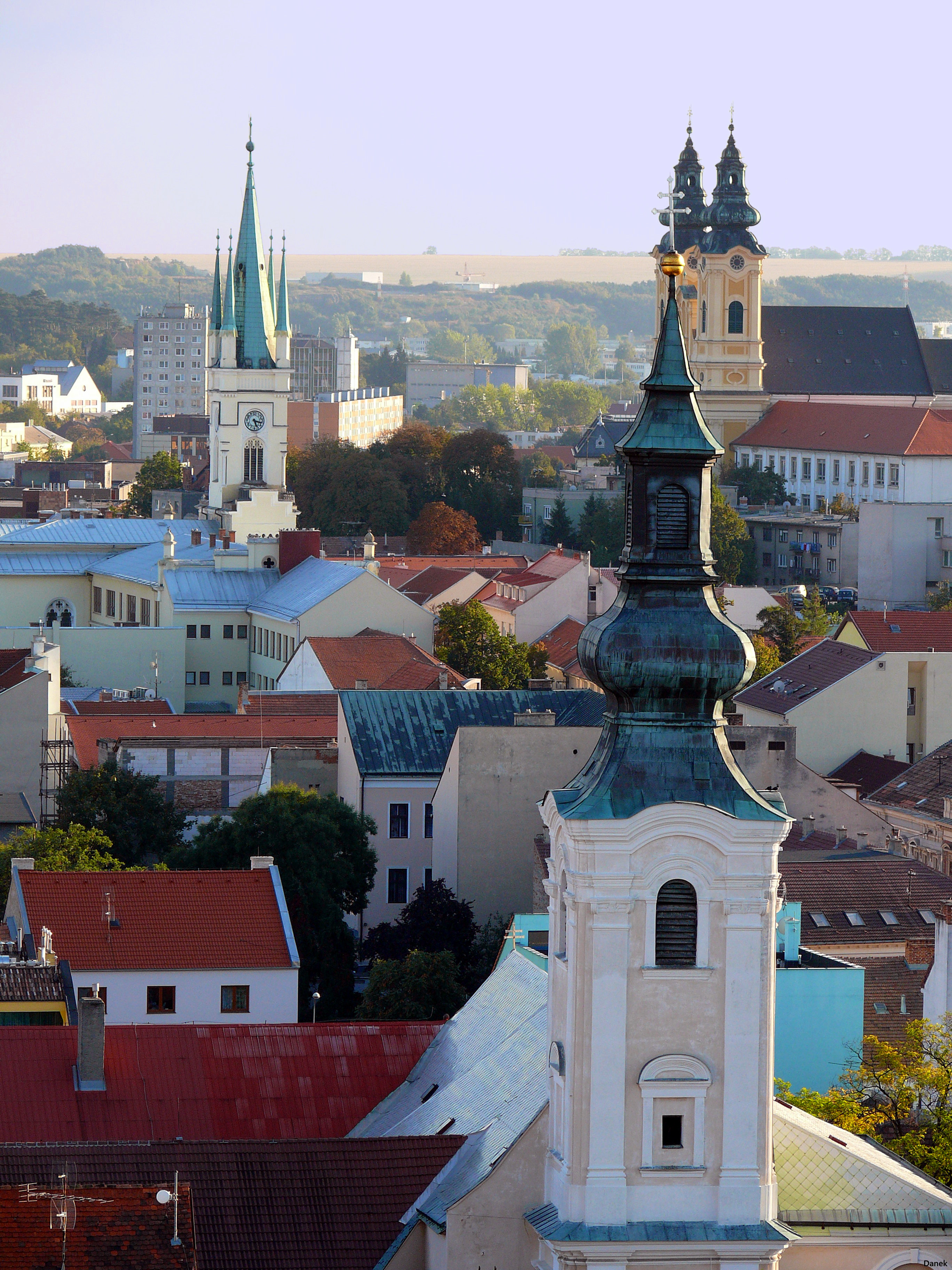
View from Nitra Castle

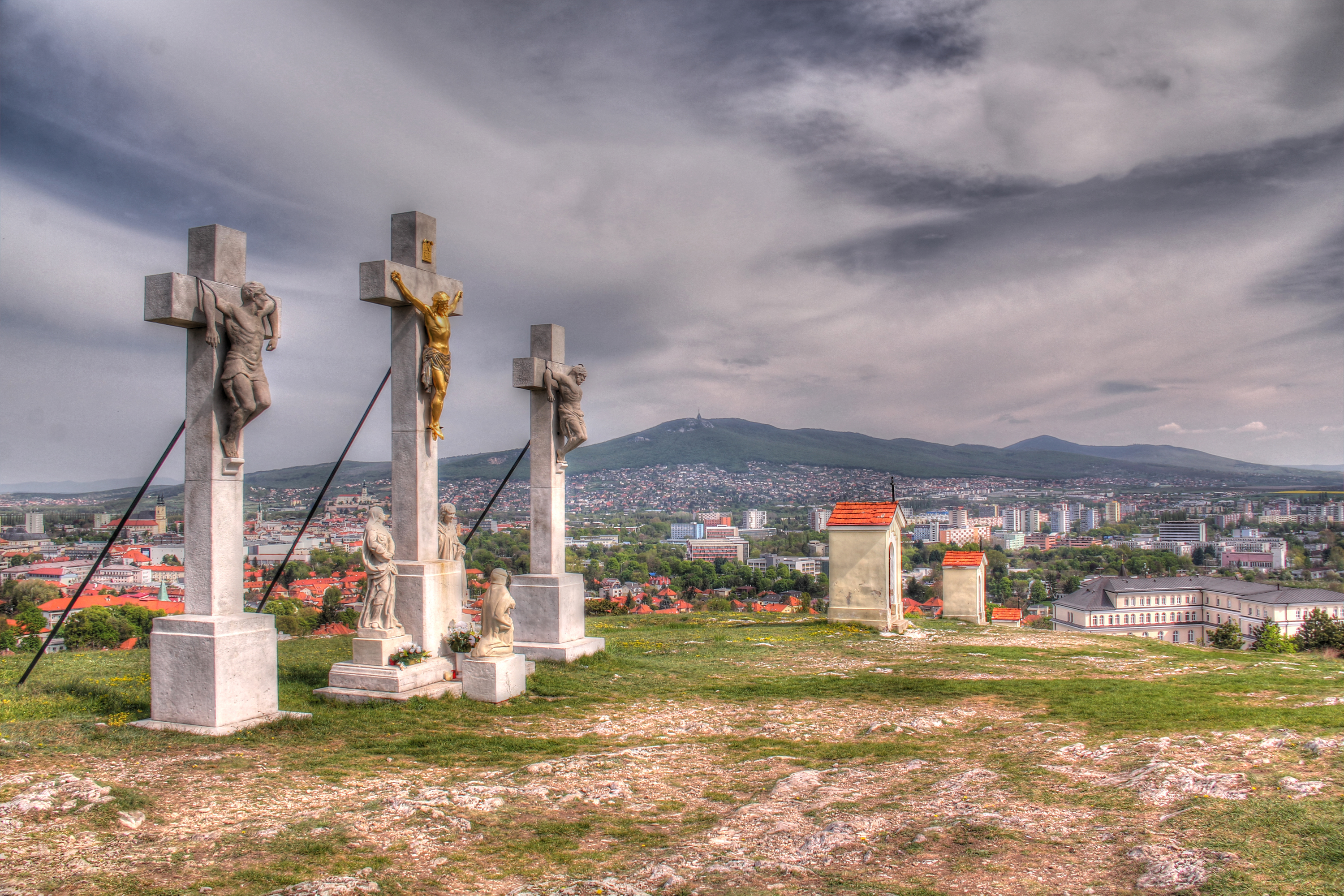
Calvary hill in Nitra

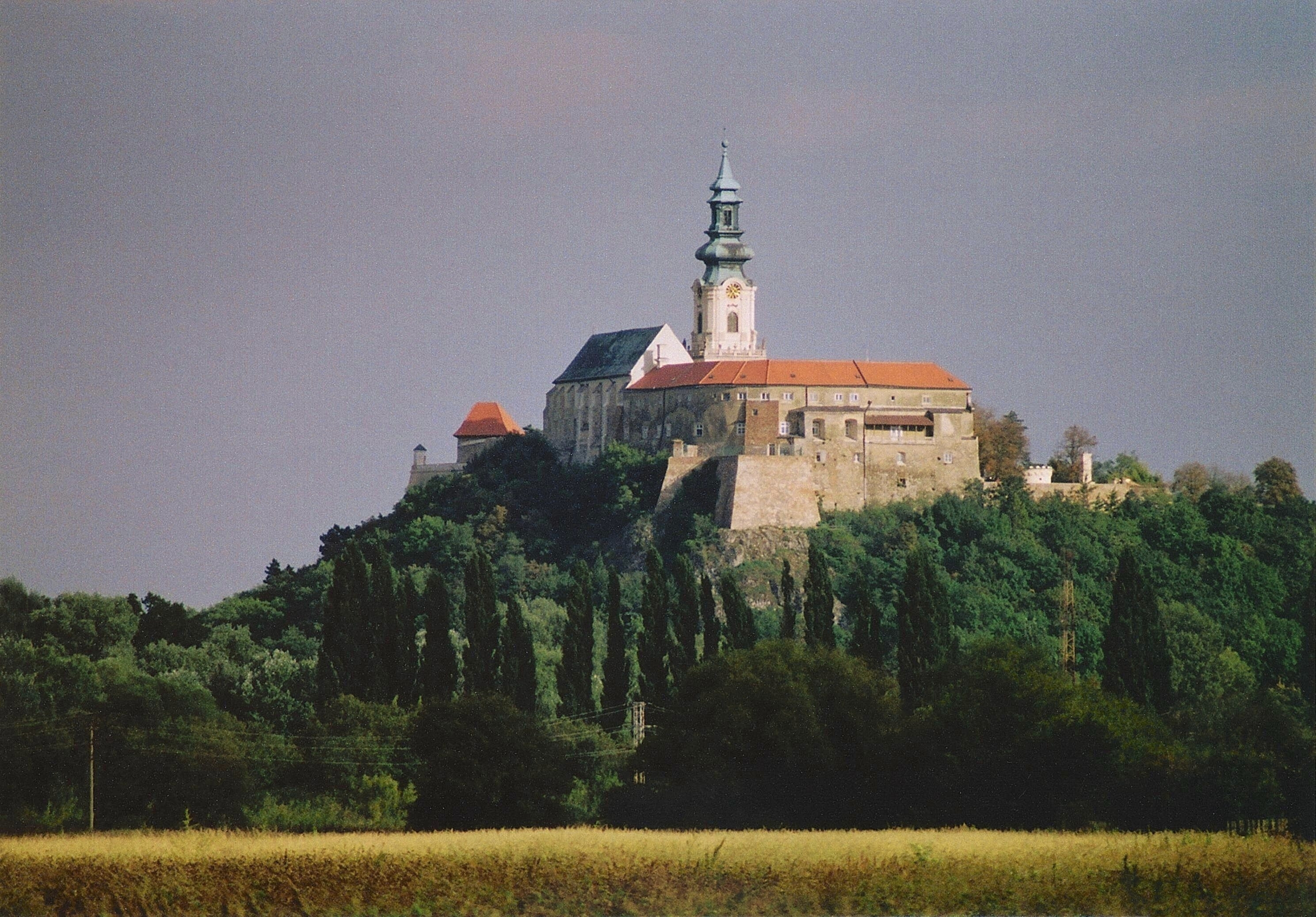
Nitra Castle

== Main sights ==
Points of interest in the area include the Nitra Castle, the old town, and the adjacent hill, named Zobor, overlooking the city.

Notable religious structures located in Nitra are St. Emmeram's Cathedral in Nitra castle, a Piarist church of St. Ladislaus and the adjacent monastery. The oldest church of the city is the Saint Stephen church, which was built in the 11th-12th century, although the foundation of the building was constructed in the 9th century.

The monastery on Piaristicka street was founded in the 13th-14th century. Its dominant church of St. Ladislaus was later destroyed by a fire and remodelled in 1742–1748 in baroque style. Two towers were also added. The main altar has a statue ornamentation with the portraits of Saint Stephen and Ladislaus I of Hungary. The interior was renovated in 1940, and three modern frescos depicting themes from the Slovak history of Nitra were created.

The old town (Staré Mesto) is dominated by the castle (Hrad), which is one of the most interesting ancient structures in Slovakia. Archaeological findings indicate that a large fortified castle had already stood here at the time of Samo's Empire, in the seventh century. Archaeological findings prove the existence of a church from the ninth century beneath the more recent Gothic St. Emmeram's Cathedral. The construction of the stone castle began during the 9th century during the reign of the Prince of Nitra Svätopluk. The castle currently serves as the seat of one of Roman Catholic bishoprics in Slovakia, which was founded in 880 as the first bishopric of western and eastern Slavs, which continued its existence since then, with a break from the 10th century until around 1110.

The Dražovce church is a remarkable example of the early Romanesque architecture.

The Nitra Synagogue was built in 1908-1911 for the Neolog Jewish community. It was designed by Lipót (Leopold) Baumhorn (1860–1932), the prolific Budapest-based synagogue architect. Located in a narrow lane, the building is typical of Baumhorn's style. A mélange of Moorish, Byzantine, and Art Nouveau elements, it faces the street with a two-tower façade. The sanctuary is a domed hall supported by four pillars that also support the women's gallery. After more than a decade of restoration by the municipality of Nitra, the building is now used as a center for cultural activities. The women's gallery houses "The Fate of Slovak Jews" – Slovakia's national Holocaust memorial exhibition. The Nitra Synagogue serves as a permanent exhibition space for graphic works by the Nitra-born Israeli artist Shraga Weil.

The most powerful medium wave transmitter of Slovakia, running on 1098 kHz, was situated in Nitra at Velke Kostolany until recently. This transmitter could broadcast throughout all of Europe at night. Since 2003, however, it has operated on lower output to save energy costs and has transmitted regional programming only.

The Virgin Mary's mission house at Calvary Hill was built in 1765 for the Spanish order of Nazarens. They were taking care of the church and the pilgrims. Later, the building served as an orphanage. In 1878-85, this building was rebuilt in the Novoromanesque style, and in 1925, a new floor was added to the building. The building as we know it today is a work of the Slovak architect M. M. Harminec. Nowadays, the whole building is the mission house of The Divine Word Society. The Mission museum of nations and cultures is located in this building.

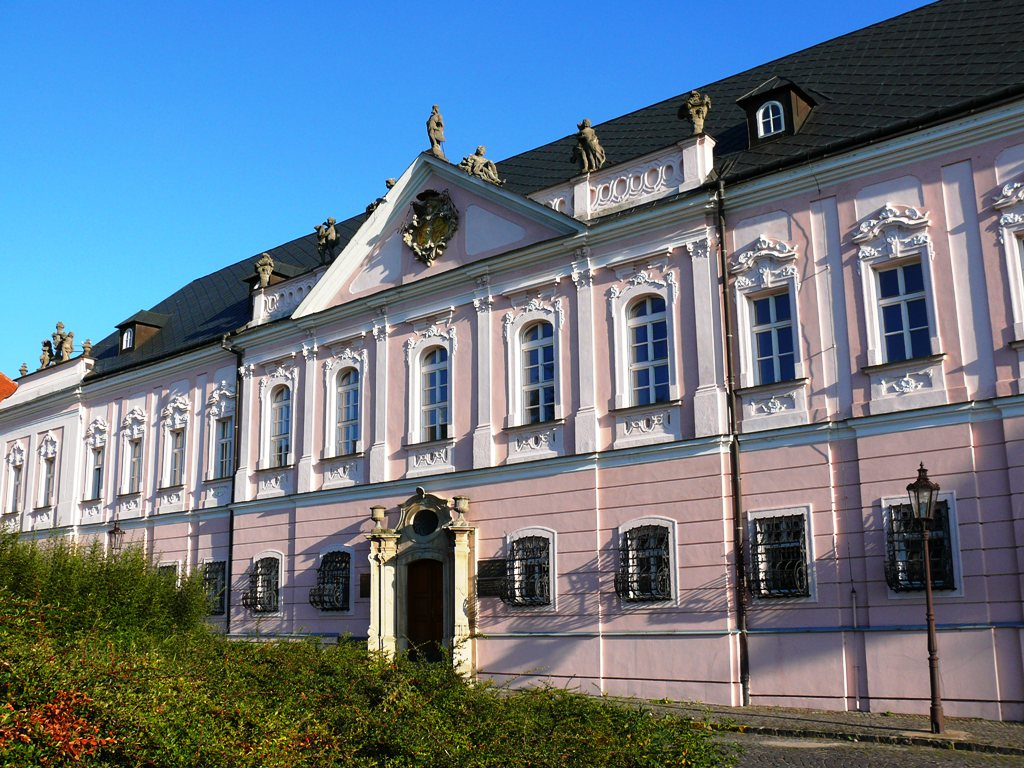
Great Seminary

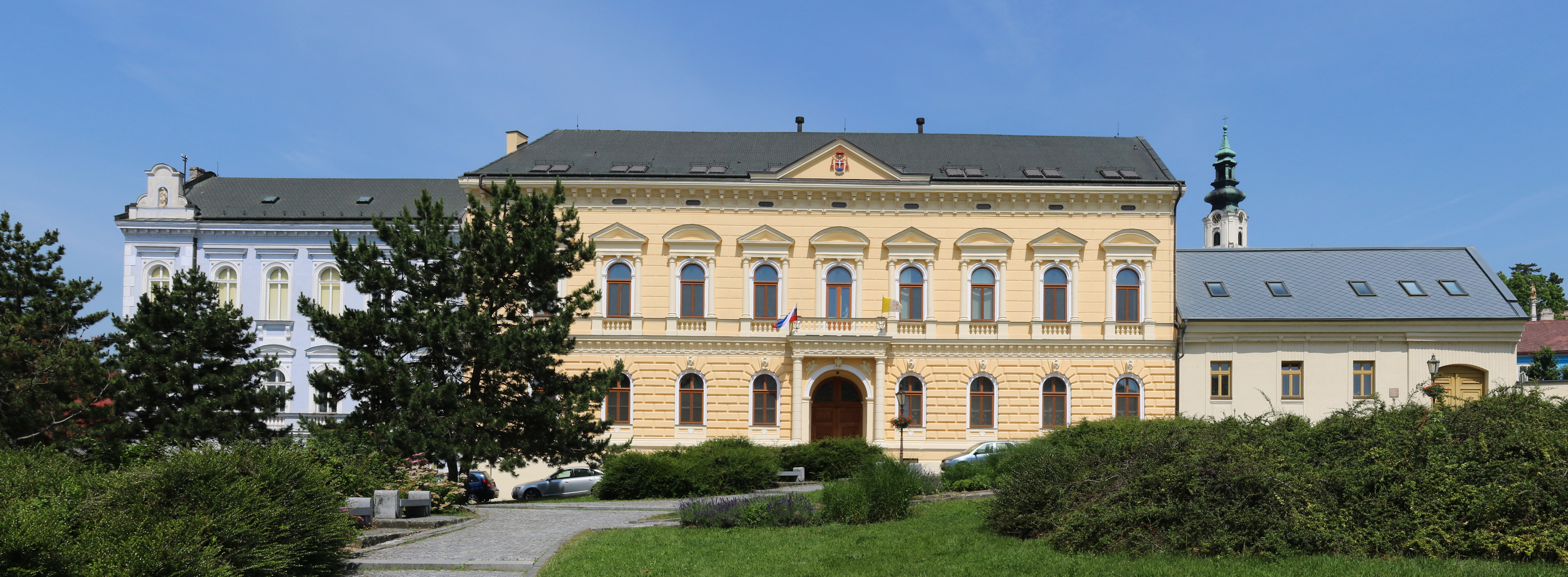
Little Seminary

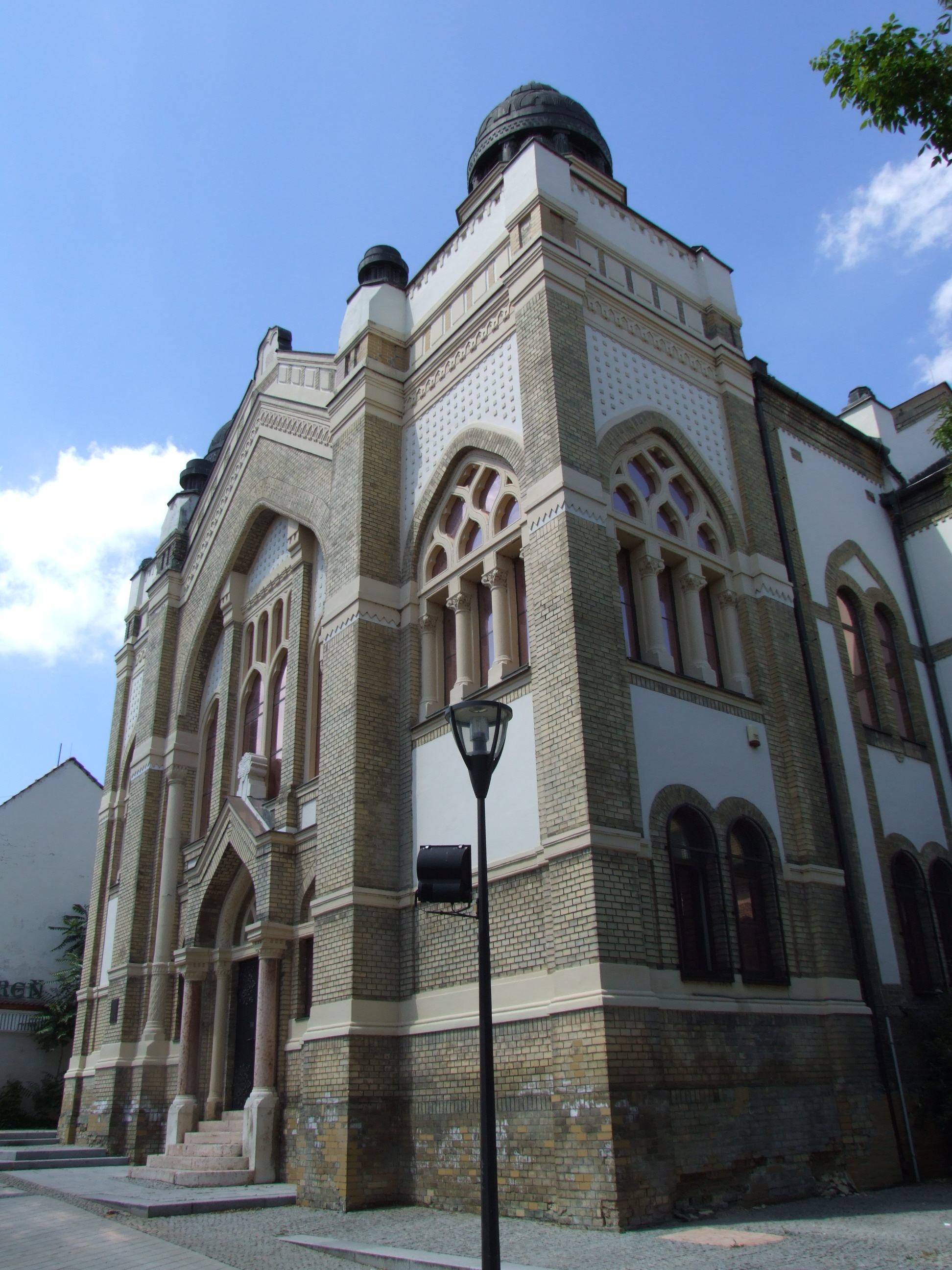
Nitra Synagogue

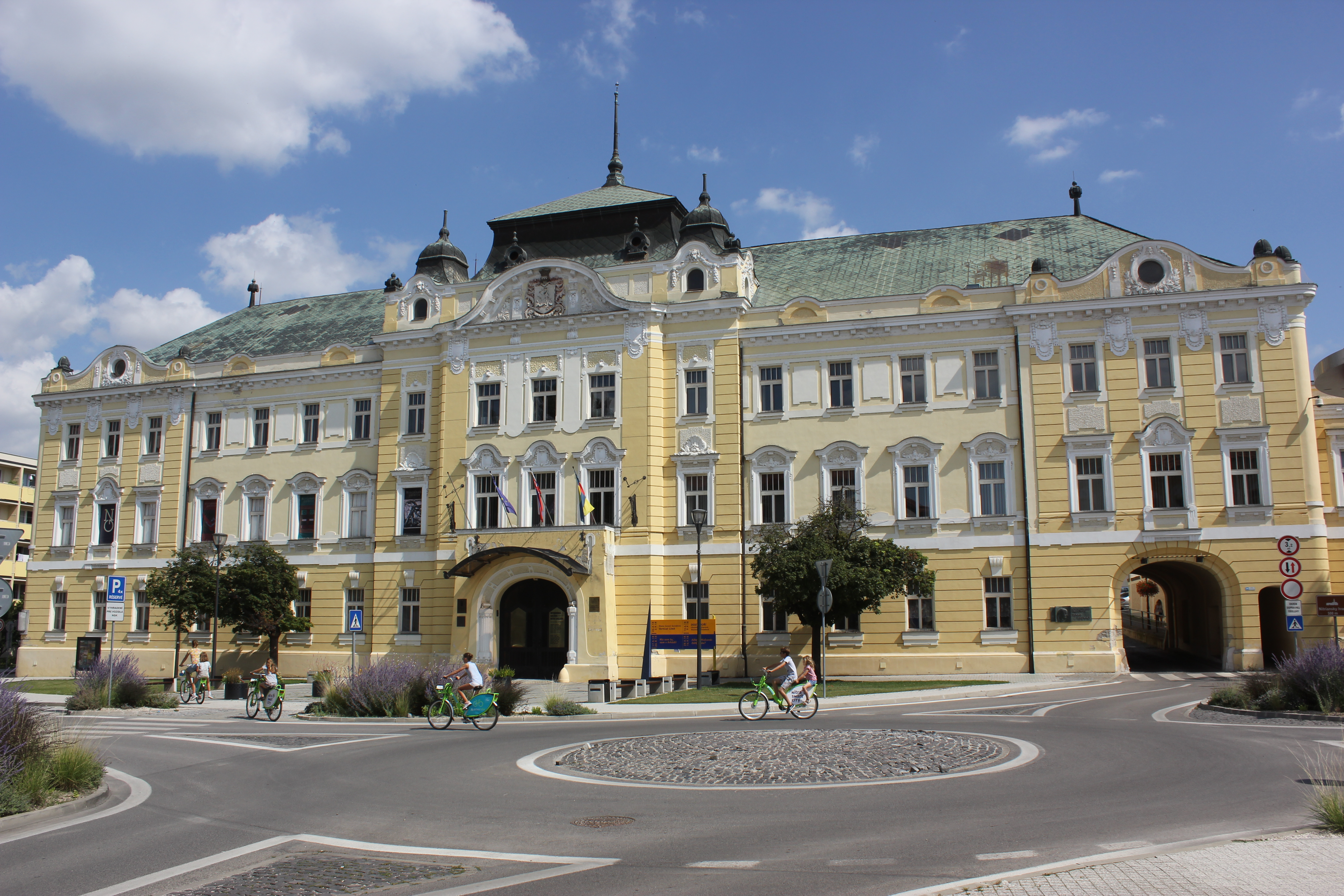
County Hall (Župný Dom)

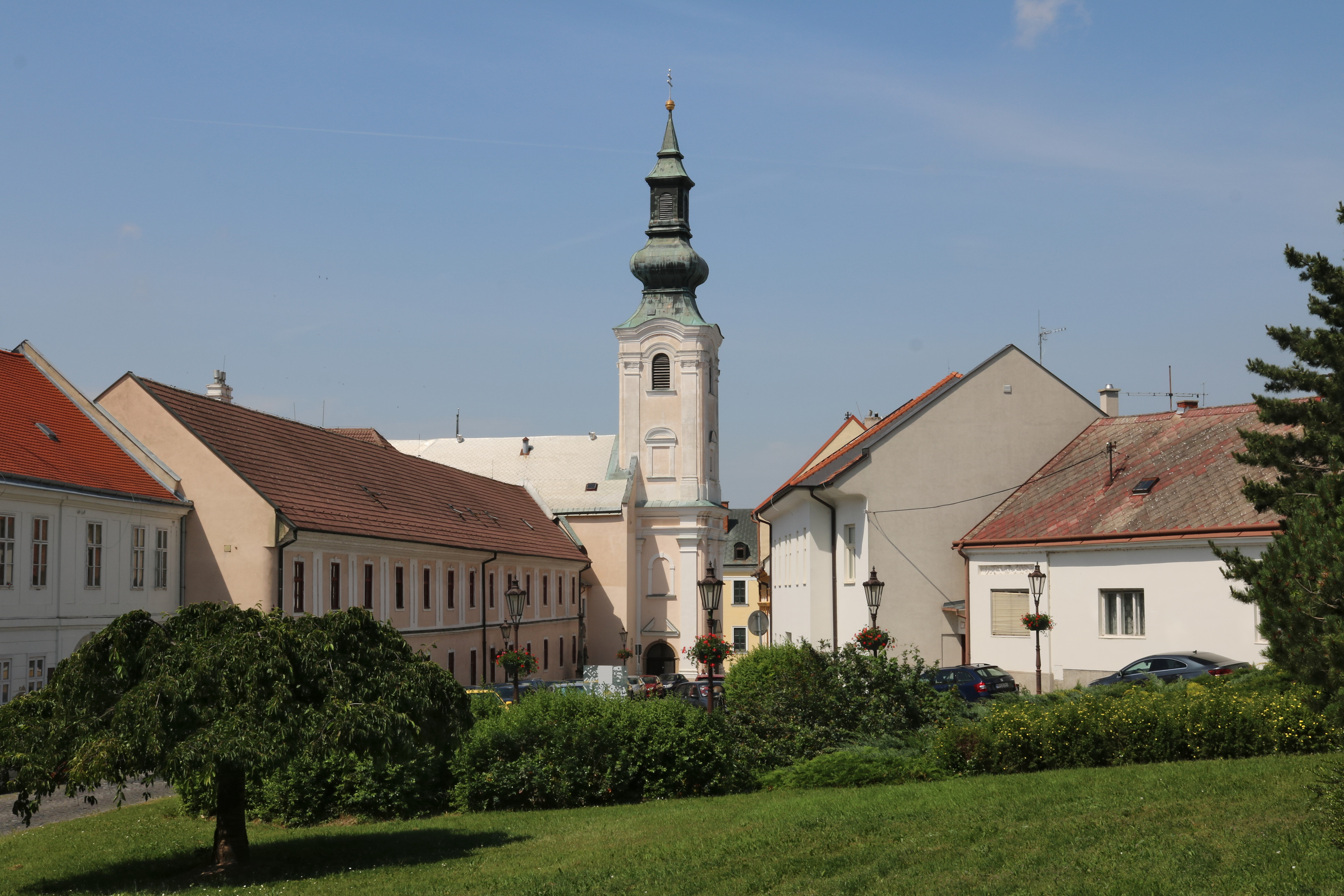
St. Peter and Paul Church

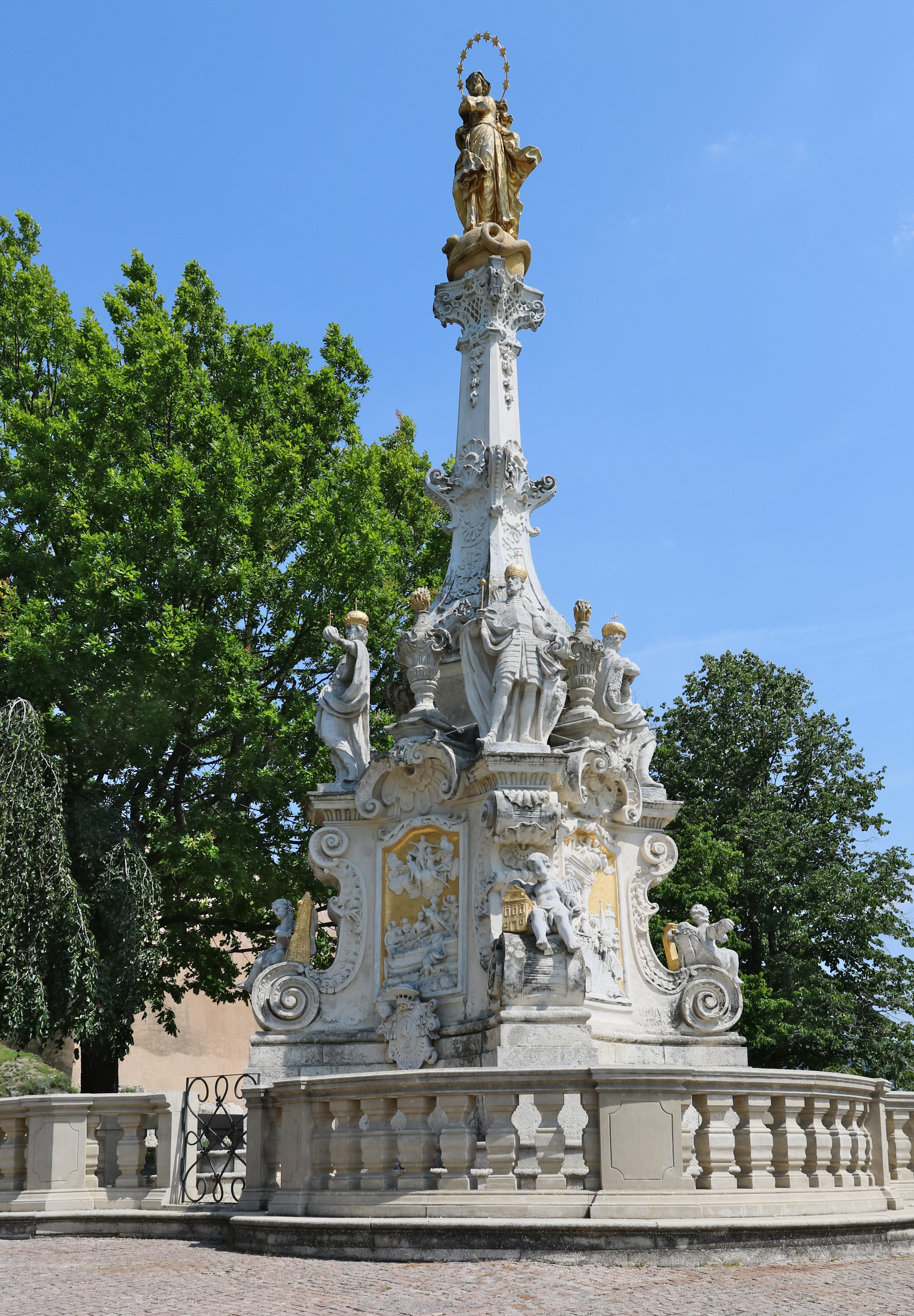
Plague Column

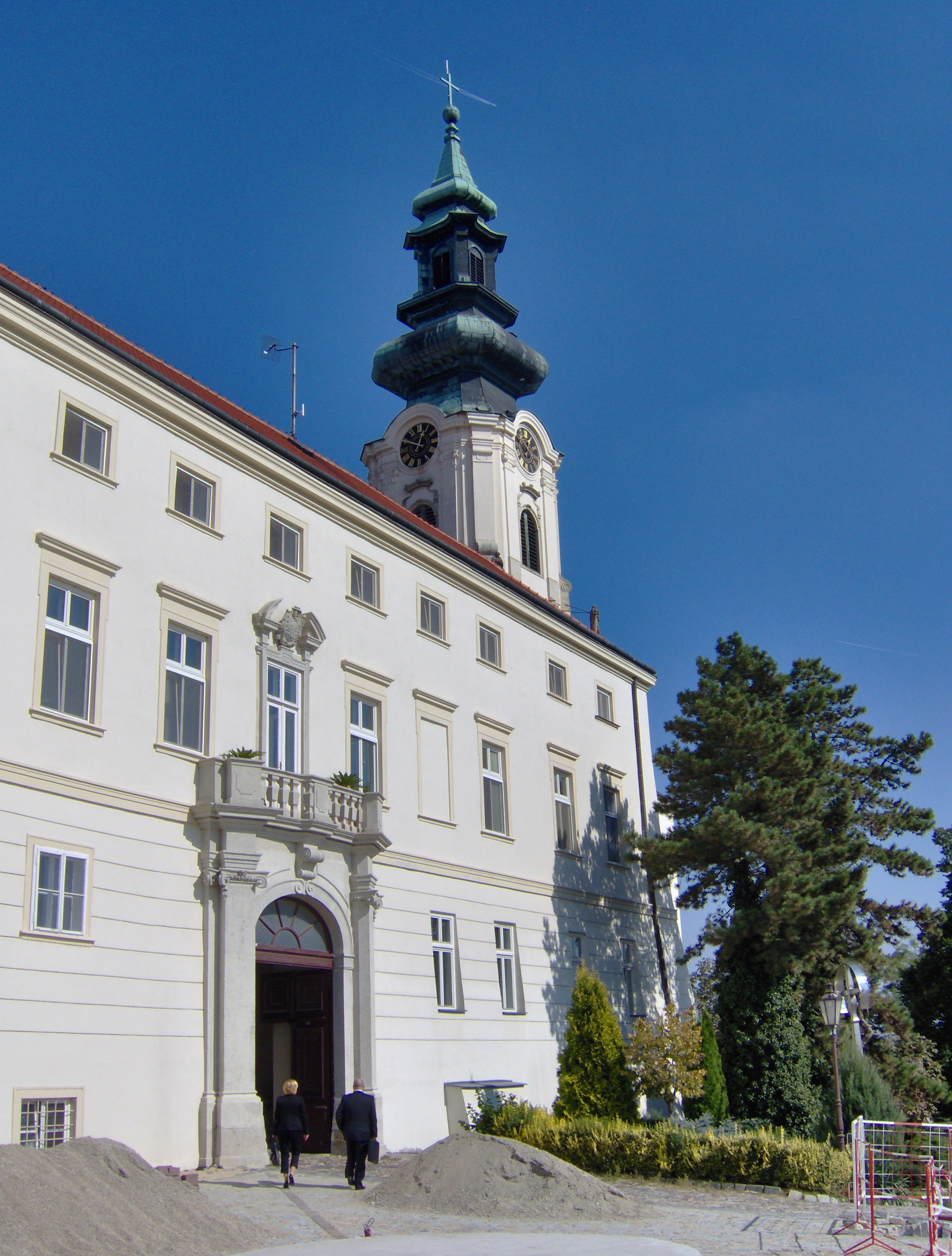
Bishop's Palace

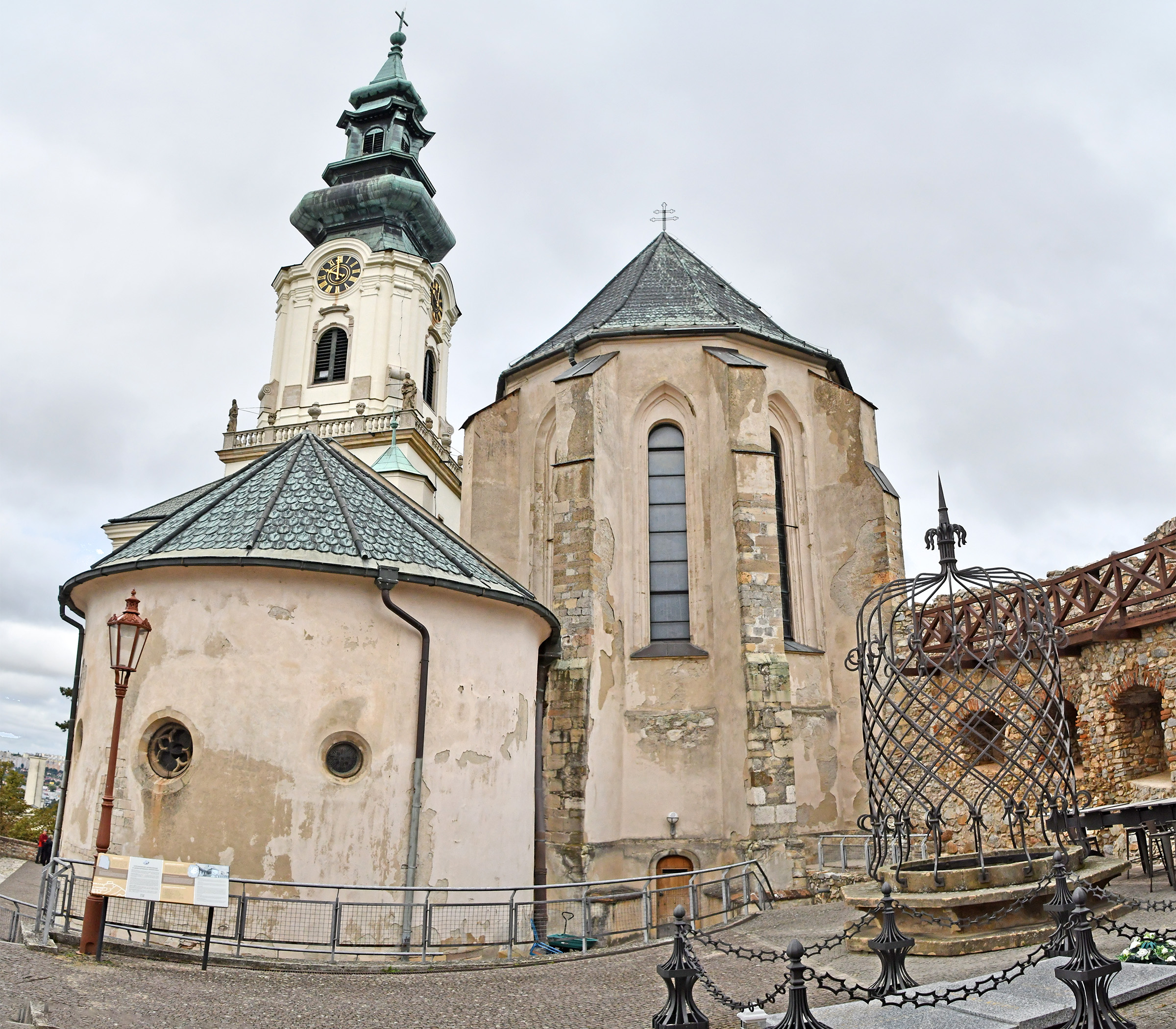
St. Emmeram's Cathedral

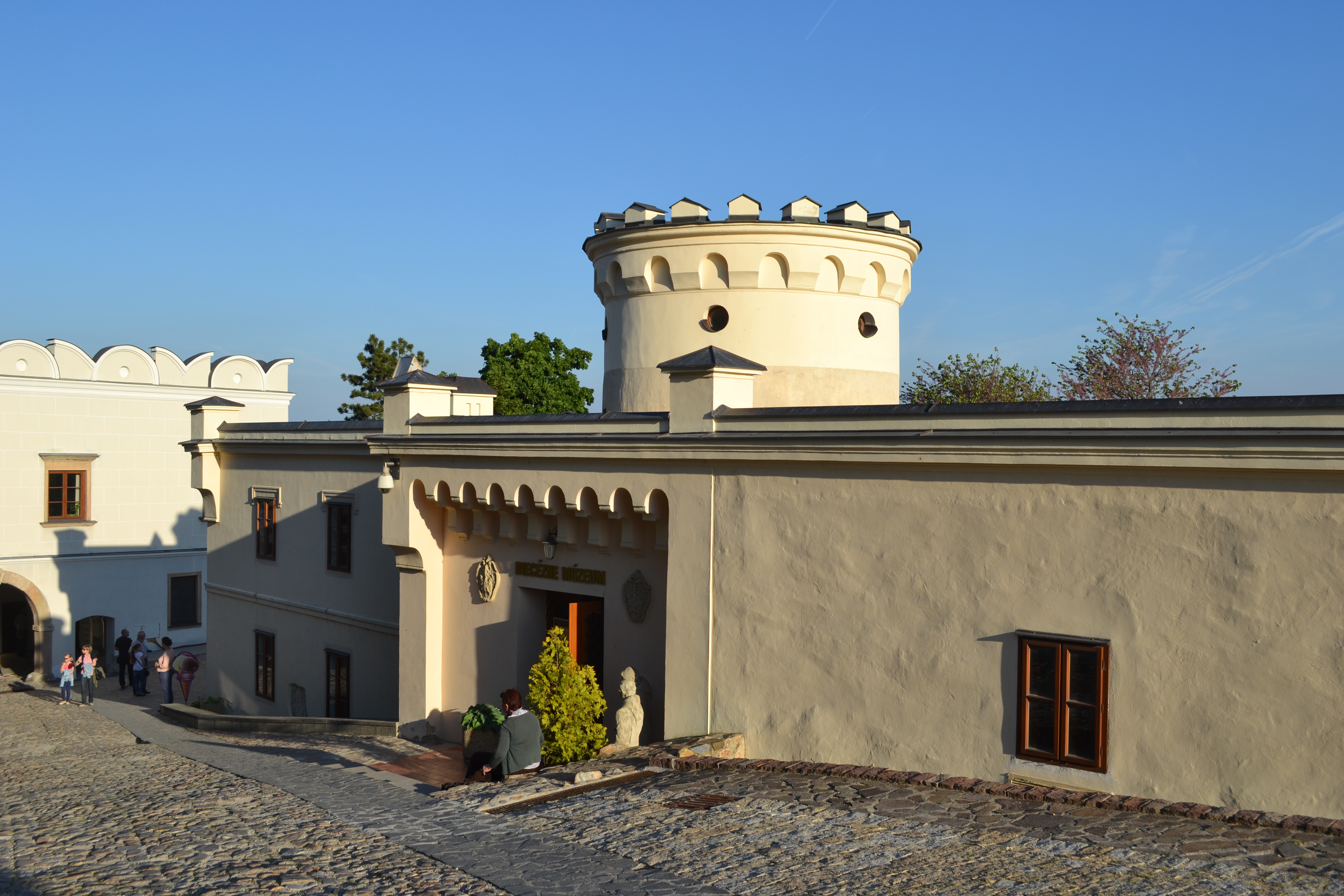
Diocese Museum

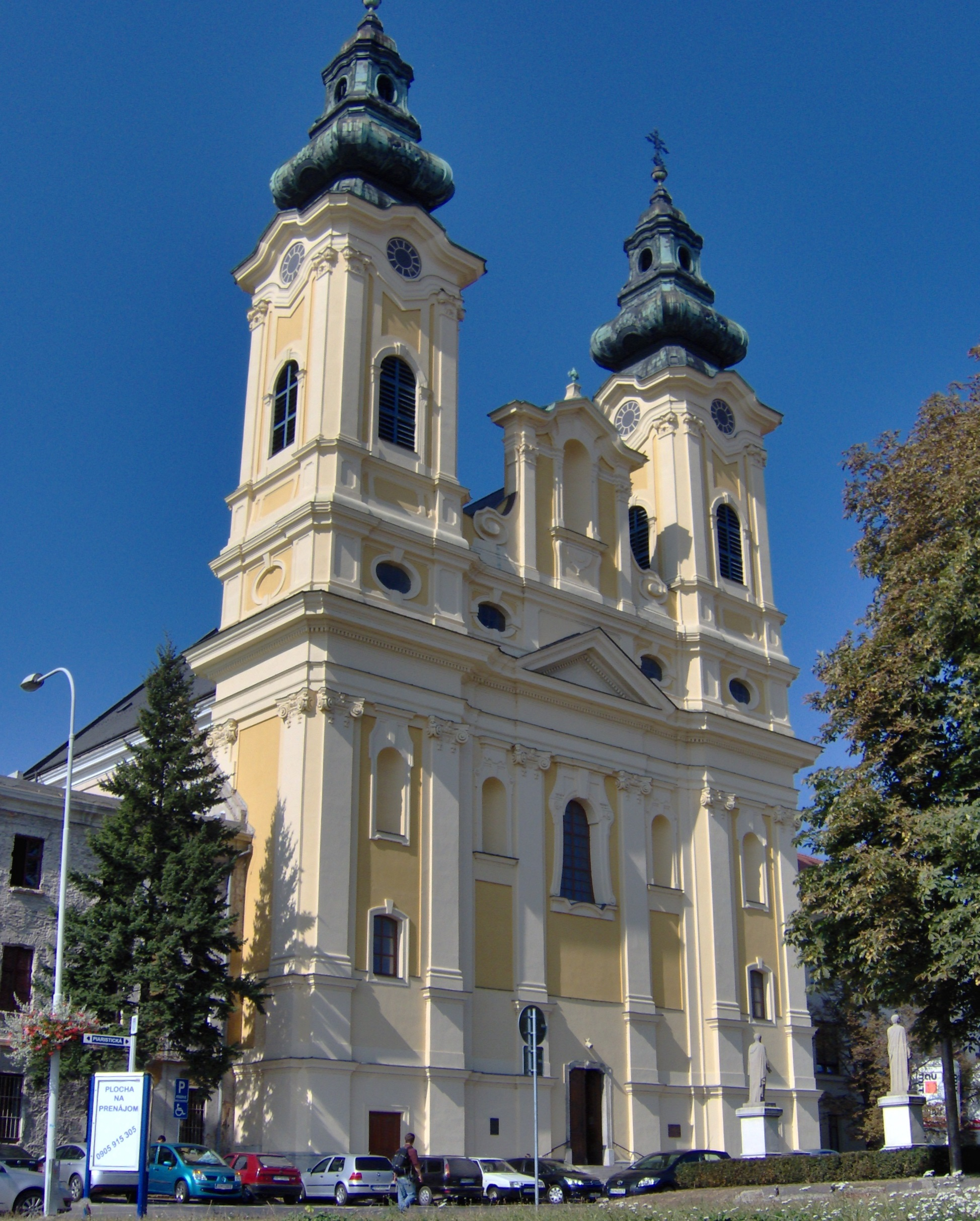
St. Ladislaus Church

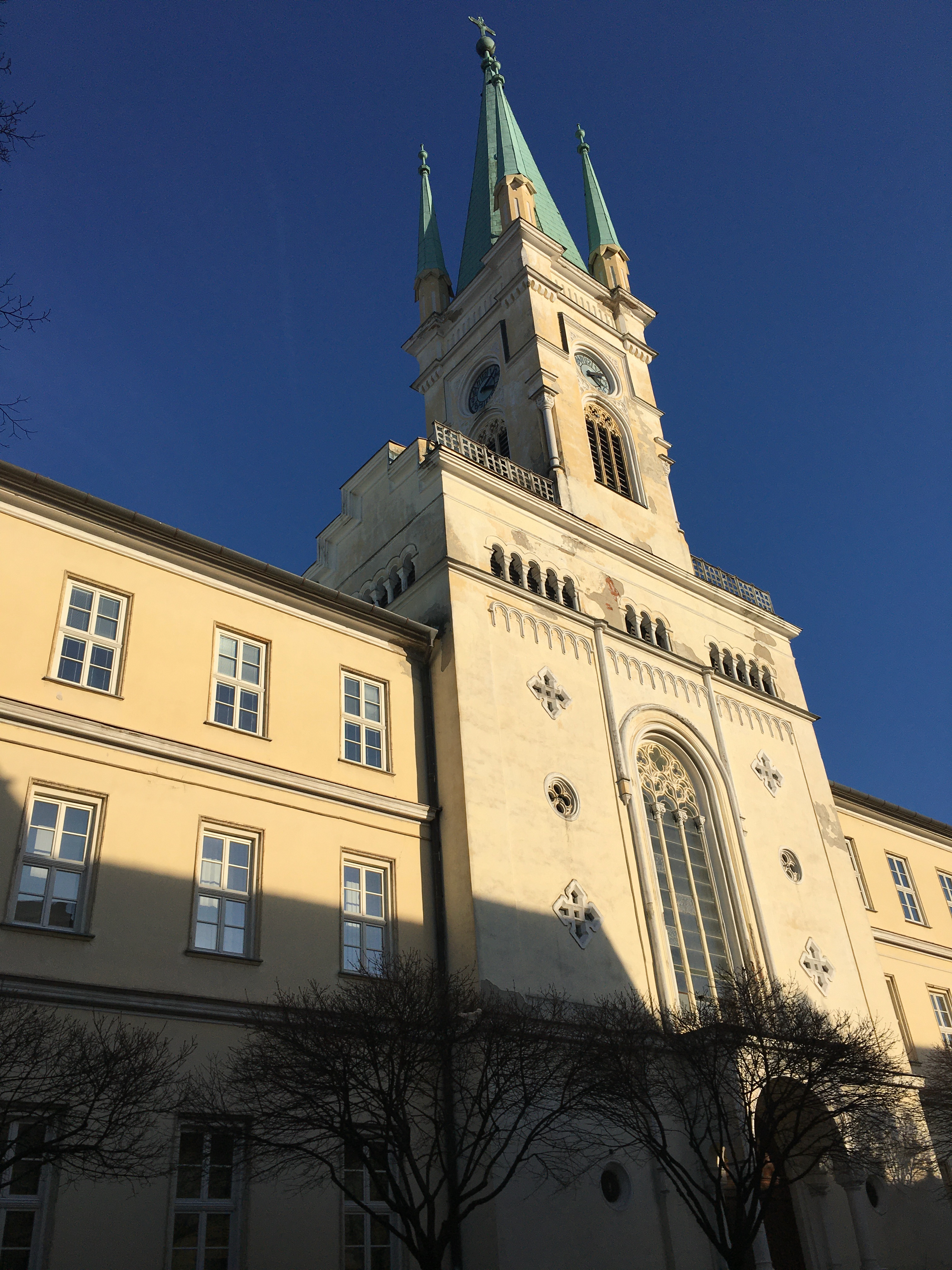
Church of the Visitation of the Virgin Mary

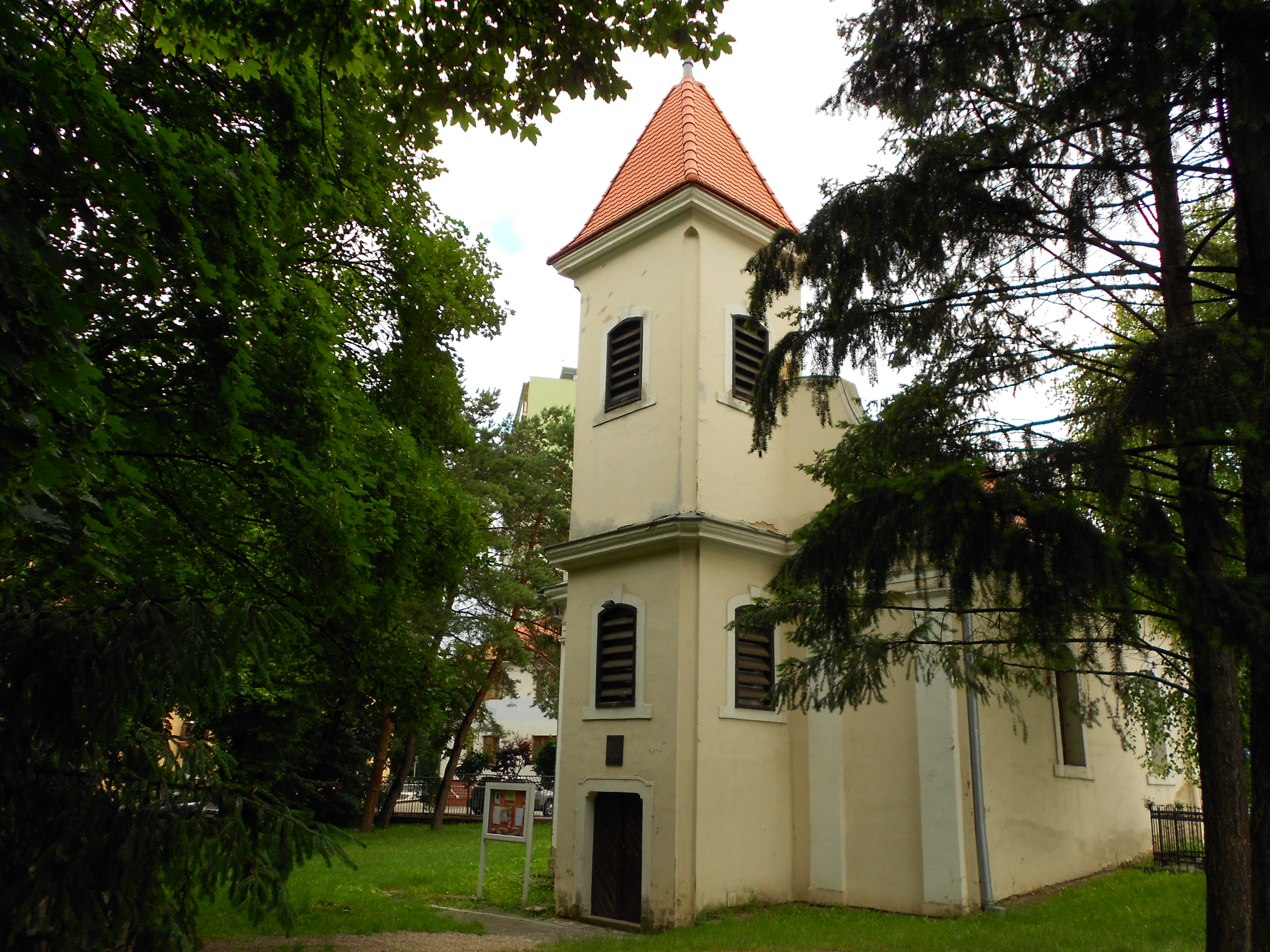
St. Stephen's Church

== Population ==
Historical population
Year	Pop.	±%
1970	52,518	—
1980	68,852	+31.1%
1991	85,471	+24.1%
2001	87,285	+2.1%
2011	78,916	−9.6%
2021	78,489	−0.5%
Source: Censuses

Population statistic (10 years)
Year	1995	2005	2015	2025
Count	87,357	85,172	77,670	75,301
Difference		−2.50%	−8.80%	−3.05%

Population statistic
Year	2024	2025
Count	75,945	75,301
Difference		−0.84%

It has a population of 75,301 people (31 December 2025).

=== Ethnicity ===
Census 2021 (1+%)
Ethnicity	Number	Fraction
Slovak	71,552	91.16%
Not found out	5364	6.83%
Hungarian	1065	1.35%
Total	78,489	

In year 2021 was 78,489 people by ethnicity 71,552 as Slovak, 5364 as Not found out, 1065 as Hungarian, 704 as Czech, 416 as Other, 271 as Romani, 149 as Russian, 124 as Rusyn, 123 as Polish, 110 as German, 100 as Ukrainian, 90 as Italian, 85 as Vietnamese, 52 as Moravian, 38 as Chinese, 33 as Serbian, 32 as Jewish, 32 as Bulgarian, 27 as Croatian, 27 as Albanian, 25 as English, 23 as Greek, 21 as Romanian, 17 as Turkish, 16 as Austrian, 13 as French, 10 as Irish, 7 as Canadian, 4 as Iranian, 2 as Silesian and 1 as Korean.

Note on population: The difference values of population numbers in the table "Population statistic" and in the sections "Ethnicity" & "Religion" is caused by the use of various statistical methods.

=== Religion ===
Census 2021 (1+%)
Religion	Number	Fraction
Roman Catholic Church	43,511	55.44%
None	23,332	29.73%
Not found out	6694	8.53%
Evangelical Church	2006	2.56%
Total	78,489	

In year 2021 was 78,489 people by religion 43,511 from Roman Catholic Church, 23,332 from None, 6694 from Not found out, 2006 from Evangelical Church, 566 from Greek Catholic Church, 430 from Christian Congregations in Slovakia, 343 from Ad hoc movements, 322 from Other, 195 from Eastern Orthodox Church, 161 from Calvinist Church, 160 from Other and not ascertained christian church, 141 from Buddhism, 109 from Jehovah's Witnesses, 107 from Paganism and natural spirituality, 93 from Apostolic Church, 81 from Old Catholic Church, 67 from Islam, 42 from Church of the Brethren, 40 from Jewish community, 29 from United Methodist Church, 19 from Hinduism, 14 from Seventh-day Adventist Church, 9 from Church of Jesus Christ of Latter-day Saints, 8 from Czechoslovak Hussite Church, 5 from Bahá'i Community, 4 from Baptists Church and 1 from New Apostolic Church.

=== Historical ===
The demographics changed dramatically during the 20th century; in 1910, from a total population of 16,419, some 9,754 (59.4%) were Hungarians, 4,929 (30.0%) Slovaks, and 1,636 (9.96%) Germans - Jews are hidden under these nationalities. (According to the Slovak Jewish Heritage Center, Jews made up a quarter of the total population, and the vast majority of them spoke Hungarian and were, for census purposes, not counted as a separate ethnicity to inflate the number of Hungarians.) In 1940, Nitra was home to 4,358 Jews. In the 21st century, the population of Nitra began declining from the peak of 87,690 in 2002 to 75,208 in 2025.

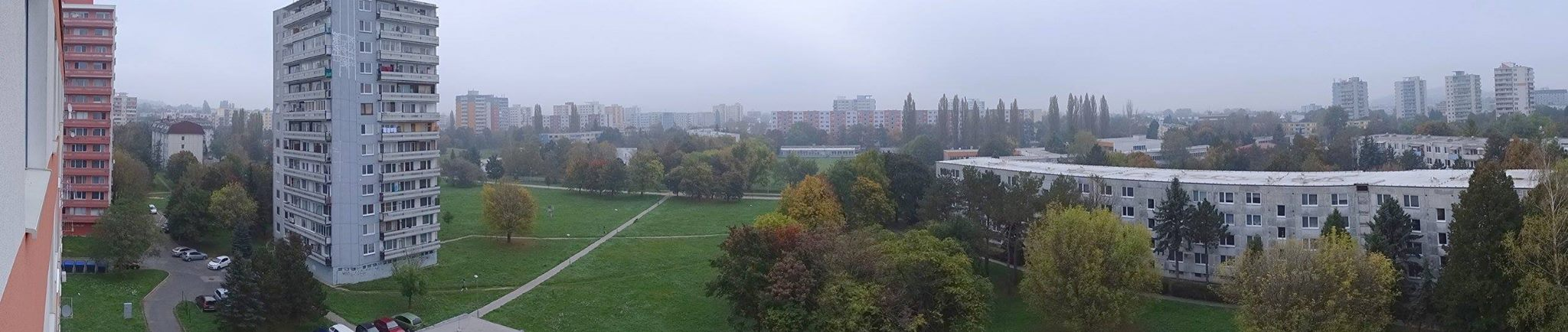
Panoramic view of the Chrenová housing estate

== Economy ==
GDP per capita in 2008 for the whole Nitra region was €10,508, which was below Slovakia's average (€12,395). Nitra's enterprises were a brewery, a grain mill, food processing plants, and other food-related industries. In the new free trade economy after 1989, and after entering the European Union and the Euro currency club, only the wine bottling plant is left. Out of the factories started under the communist regime, 1948–1989, the plastic processing plant is still doing well. The most prevalent industries are electronics and car parts, concentrated in the new business park. The city plans to have a balanced budget of 42 mil€ in 2011.

The flight operator Aero Slovakia has its head office on the grounds of Nitra Airport.

== Government ==
The city is governed by mayor (Slovak: primátor) and the city council (Slovak: mestské zastupiteľstvo). The mayor is the head of the city and its chief executive. The term of office is four years. The current mayor is Marek Hattas. The city council is the legislative body, with 31 council members.

The city is divided into 13 urban districts (boroughs): Dolné Krškany, Horné Krškany, Staré Mesto, Čermáň, Klokočina, Diely, Párovské Háje, Kynek, Mlynárce, Zobor, Dražovce, Chrenová, and Janíkovce.

== Education ==
Nitra is the seat of two universities: University of Constantinus the Philosopher, with 13,684 students, including 446 doctoral students. and of the Slovak University of Agriculture, with 10,297 students, including 430 doctoral students. The city's system of primary education consists of 14 public schools and three religious primary schools, enrolling in overall 6,945 pupils. Secondary education is represented by five gymnasia with 3,349 students, 8 specialized high schools with 3,641 students, and 5 vocational schools with 3,054 students. Schools in the city include the United Catholic School.

Nitra used to be the site of the Jewish school Yeshiva of Nitra, the last surviving yeshiva in occupied Europe during World War II, associated with famous rabbis Chaim Michael Dov Weissmandl and Shmuel Dovid Ungar. The yeshiva was moved to Mount Kisco, New York, US, after the Second World War, where it still exists.

== Transportation ==
Nitra is connected to Bratislava, Trnava, Žiar nad Hronom, Zvolen, and Banská Bystrica by a freeway (E58). There are also first-class road connections to Topoľčany, Zlaté Moravce (labelled as "Highway of Death"), Vráble and Nové Zámky.

The Nitra railway station forms part of the railway line between Nové Zámky/Šurany and Prievidza, which passes through Nitra, but is not a main line. There is a railway junction a short distance north of the town, connecting the city with Leopoldov, Topoľčany, and Radošina. Nitra has one train connection with Prague via Piešťany, Trenčín, Uherský Brod, Olomouc and Pardubice. This connection is operated by Arriva (AEx).

Nitra also has its own recreational airfield; it hosts the factory of the Aeropro Eurofox ultralight. However, the closest international airport is Bratislava Airport.

Local public transport is based on buses with 28 lines, covering the whole city, as well as extending to the neighbouring municipalities of Lužianky, Nitrianske Hrnčiarovce, Štitáre, Ivanka pri Nitre and Branč (as of April 2016).

== Localities ==
- Horné Krškany

== Culture ==
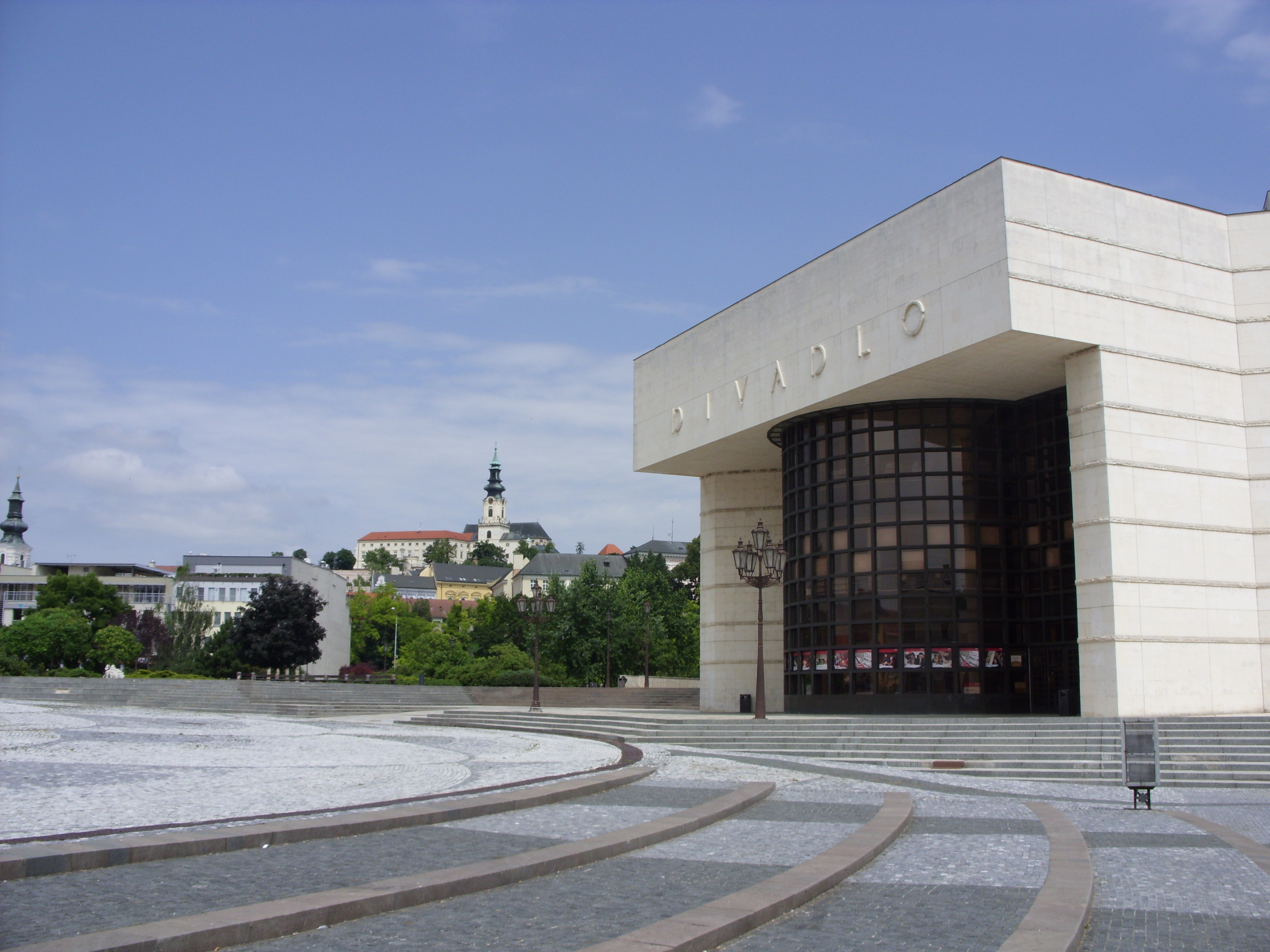
The Andrej Bagar Theatre, with the Nitra Castle in the background

Nitra is home to several museums and galleries. The Museum of the Nitra Region supervises a collection of objects in several fields (Archaeology, Ethnography, Numismatics, Geology, and Zoology). Since 1993, it has also had an exhibition of the most precious artifacts discovered by the Archaeological Institute in Nitra. The exhibition contains more than 2,200 gold, silver, and other objects, among them golden-plated plaques from (pre-)Great Moravian hillfort Bojná. The Diocesan Museum of the Nitra Diocese on the Nitra Castle exhibits the facsimile of documents and archaeological discoveries closely connected to the origin of Christianity in Slovakia, including the oldest manuscript from the territory of Slovakia (the Nitra Gospel Book, 1083). Open-air museum "Osada Lupka" is a reconstruction of a Slavic village from the early Middle Ages. The Slovak Agricultural Museum specializes in the history of agriculture and is the only one of its kind in Slovakia. The museum also has an open-air exposition (skanzen). The Mission Museum of Nations and Cultures exhibits objects from missionary activities. The Museum of Jewish Culture in the synagogue presents culture and history and has a permanent exhibition dedicated to the Holocaust.

There are two theaters in Nitra: the Andrej Bagar Theatre (Divadlo Andreja Bagara) and the Old Theatre of Karol Spišák (Staré Divadlo Karola Spišáka) (Karol Spišák Old Theatre). The Nitra Amphitheater is one of the largest in Slovakia.

Nitra's main arts museum is the Nitra Gallery. Another popular gallery is The Foyer Gallery, a part of the Old Theatre of Karol Spišák. A permanent exhibition of prestigious Jewish painter Shraga Weil is installed in the Exhibition Hall of the Nitra Synagogue.

Nitra is the home town of popular Slovak music bands sk:Gladiátor, Horkýže Slíže, Desmod, sk:Zoči Voči and Borra.

== Sport ==
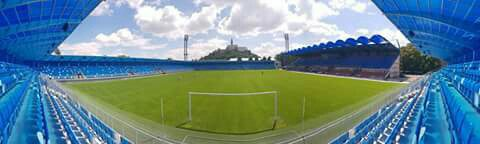
Štadión pod Zoborom following its most recent redevelopment. Nitra Castle is visible from the stadium stands.

Football and ice hockey are the most popular sports in Nitra. However, a number of other sports are also played in the city. The city's main football club is FC Nitra, which was founded in 1909. The club has played in the Czechoslovak top division, finishing as runners-up once and third once. Following the dissolution of Czechoslovakia and the establishment of an independent Slovakia, FC Nitra played in the Slovak top division, where its best finish was third place. FC Nitra have reached the final of the Slovak Cup four times, but have never won the competition. The club has also competed in various European club competitions on several occasions. FC Nitra has been based in Sihoť Park since its foundation, approximately on the site of the present-day Štadión pod Zoborom, which has a capacity of 7,246. The stadium's most recent complete reconstruction was completed in 2018. FC Nitra also has a women's team, which competes in the second tier of the Slovak women's football league system.

Several smaller football clubs are also based in the city. FK Nitra, formerly known as TJ Strojár Nitra and ČFK Nitra, is based in the Klokočina and Čermáň districts. TJ Slovan Nitra-Chrenová is based in the Chrenová district, while ŠK Nitra-Dolné Krškany is based in the Dolné Krškany district. These clubs compete in the lower levels of the Slovak football league system. There are also other football clubs in some of the city's other districts, but they compete only in the lowest amateur competitions.

In 2013, three Group B matches of the UEFA European Under-17 Championship were played at Štadión pod Zoborom in Nitra. In 2025, the stadium also hosted three Group B matches of the UEFA European Under-21 Championship.

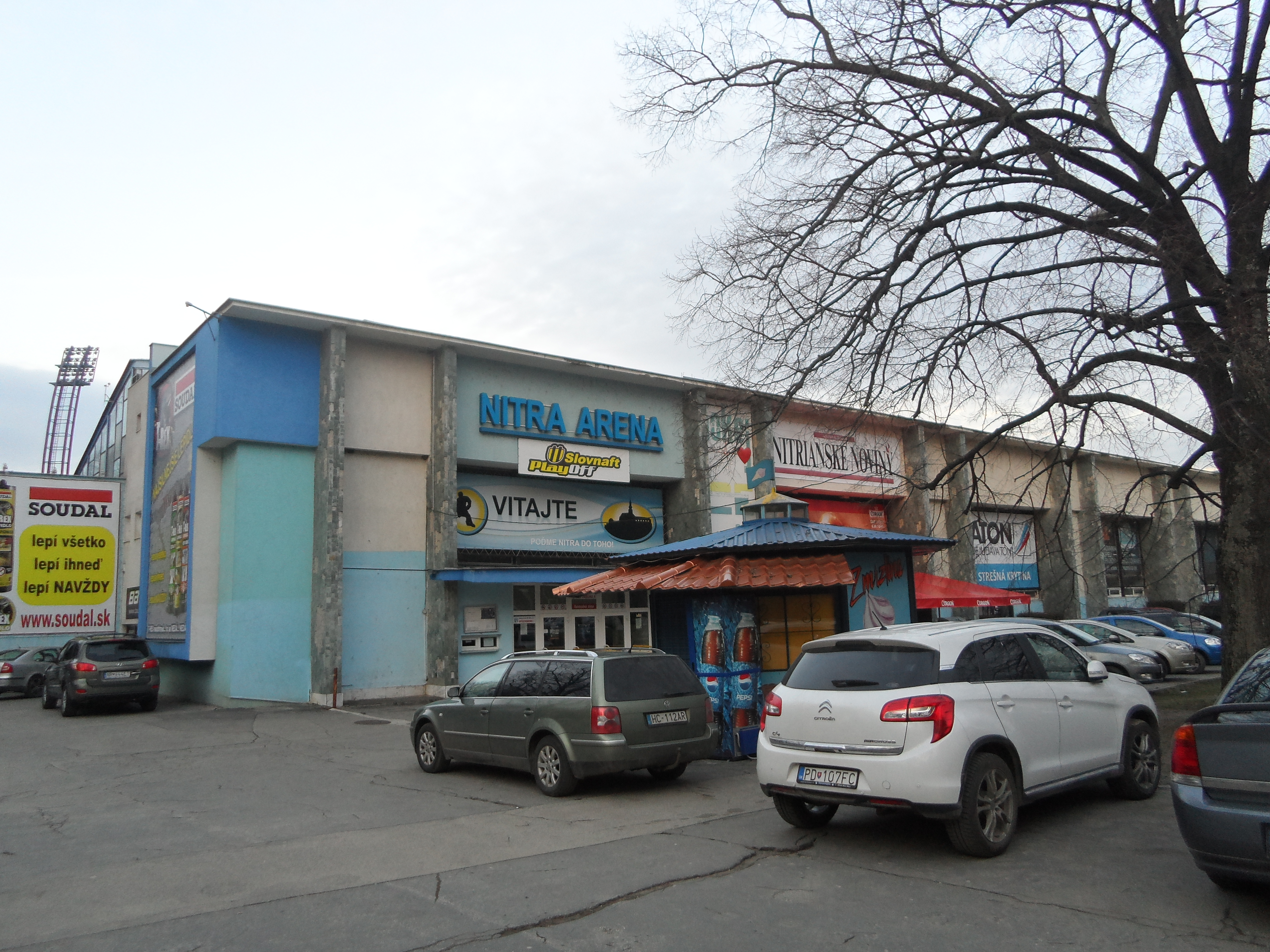
Exterior view of Nitra Arena.

The city is also home to HK Nitra, which competes in the top tier of the Slovak ice hockey league system. The club has won three Slovak championship titles, finished as runners-up five times and in third place four times. It is therefore one of the most successful ice hockey clubs in Slovakia. The club was founded in 1925 and is known for its large fan base and passionate atmosphere at its home games. HK Nitra also has a women's ice hockey team. HK Nitra has played its home games at Nitra Aréna, which has a capacity of 3,600, since 1957. In the past, the city was also home to HK 96 Dynamax Nitra, which competed in the third tier of the Slovak ice hockey league system, as well as VTJ Dukla Nitra, which played in the second tier of the Czechoslovak ice hockey league system during the 1960s. The latter club was dissolved at the end of the 1960s.

Nitra is also home to the basketball club Nitra Blue Wings, which competes in the top tier of the Slovak basketball league system. The club has finished third twice. In the past, Nitra was also represented in the top division by MBK SPU Nitra, which won two national championship titles. The club now focuses primarily on youth development. Nitra was also formerly home to the women's basketball team BK Inpek UKF Nitra, which competed in the top tier of the Slovak women's basketball league system. The club finished third on three occasions. It was dissolved in 2011.

The city was formerly home to the men's handball club HK Slávia SPU Nitra, which competed in the lower divisions. In the 1999–2000 season, the club played in the top tier of the Slovak handball league system. The women's handball team HK Nitra had a much longer and more successful tradition. Founded in 1955, the club won two Czechoslovak championship titles. In the Slovak top division, it finished as runners-up twice and in third place three times. The club was dissolved in 2012. A second women's handball club, UDHK ŠG Nitra, was founded in the city in 2002 in association with the local sports grammar school. From the 2011–12 season, the club spent two seasons playing in the top tier of the Czechoslovak league system. The club currently focuses on youth development.

The city is also home to the volleyball club VKP SPU Nitra, which was founded in 1952. The club competes in the top tier of the Slovak volleyball league system, where it has won two national championship titles, finished as runners-up once and in third place once. Nitra is also home to the women's volleyball club Volley project UKF Nitra, which competes in the top tier of the Slovak women's volleyball league system. The club has finished as runners-up twice and in third place twice. The city is also home to a second women's volleyball team, SŠŠ Volejbal Nitra, which competes in the second tier.

Nitra has also been home to the American football club Nitra Knights since 1997. The club plays its home games at Štadión pod Zoborom and competes in the Czech top division. It won the competition in 2024 and finished as runners-up in 2026. Previously, Nitra Knights competed in Slovak competitions, where they won one championship title and finished as runners-up twice.

Boxing also has a long tradition in Nitra. The city is home to Box Club Stavbár Nitra, whose boxers regularly achieve top finishes in Slovak competitions.

== Notable people ==
- Svatopluk I (830–894), Prince of Nitra, King of Great Moravia
- Pribina (?–861), Prince of the Nitra and Balaton principalities
- Svatopluk II (?–906), Prince of Nitra
- Koceľ (c.833–c.876), Prince of the Balaton Principality
- Saint Bystrík (?–1046), Bishop of Nitra
- Béla I of Hungary (1016–1063), duke of Nitra, king of Hungary
- Stibor of Stiboricz (1348–1414) – Ispán of Nitra
- János Bottyán (1643–1709), Hungarian kuruc general
- Tamás Esze (1666–1708) Hungarian kuruc leader died here in 1708
- Imre Erdősi (1814–1890), Hungarian Piarist friar and teacher
- Vilmos Fraknói (1843–1924), Hungarian historian
- Béla Bangha (1880–1940), Hungarian politician, was born here
- Mariana Čengel Solčanská (born 1978), director
- Natália Germáni (1993-), actress
- Oszkar Grosz (1896–1968), Shipowner in England
- Peter Gajdoš (born 1959), general and politician
- Marja Holecyová (born 1988), mathematician and sci-fi writer
- Juraj Kolník (1980–), professional ice hockey player
- Anton Lehmden (1929–2018), painter, draughtsman, and printmaker
- Branislav Mezei (1980–), professional ice hockey player
- Ľubomír Moravčík (1965–), football player
- Zita Pleštinská, maiden name Kányaiová (1961-), member of the European Parliament
- Ottokár Prohászka (1858–1927), Hungarian Roman Catholic theologian and Bishop of Székesfehérvár
- Shmuel Dovid Ungar (1886–1945), the rabbi of Nitra and dean of the Nitra Yeshiva
- Chaim Michael Dov Weissmandl (1903–1957), a rabbi who became known for his efforts to save the Jews of Slovakia during the Holocaust
- Ernest Horniak (*1907 – † 1979), SDB, Roman Catholic priest end religious prisoner (sentenced to 12 years in prison).
- Pavol Hrušovský (1952–) Deputy Speaker of the National Council of the Slovak Republic
- Štefan Ružička (1985–), professional ice hockey player
- Miroslav Stoch (1989–), professional football (soccer player), currently signed with Fenerbahçe S.K.
- Jozef Stümpel (1972–), professional ice hockey player
- Boris Valabik (1986–), professional ice hockey player
- Július Strnisko (1958–2008), wrestler.
- Emma Zapletalová (born 2000), track and field athlete.

== Twin towns – sister cities ==
Nitra is twinned with:

- Bački Petrovac, Serbia
- České Budějovice, Czech Republic
- Gosford, Australia
- Gyeongju, South Korea
- Kroměříž, Czech Republic
- Naperville, United States
- Osijek, Croatia
- Spišská Nová Ves, Slovakia
- Veszprém, Hungary
- Zielona Góra, Poland
- Zoetermeer, Netherlands

== Gallery ==
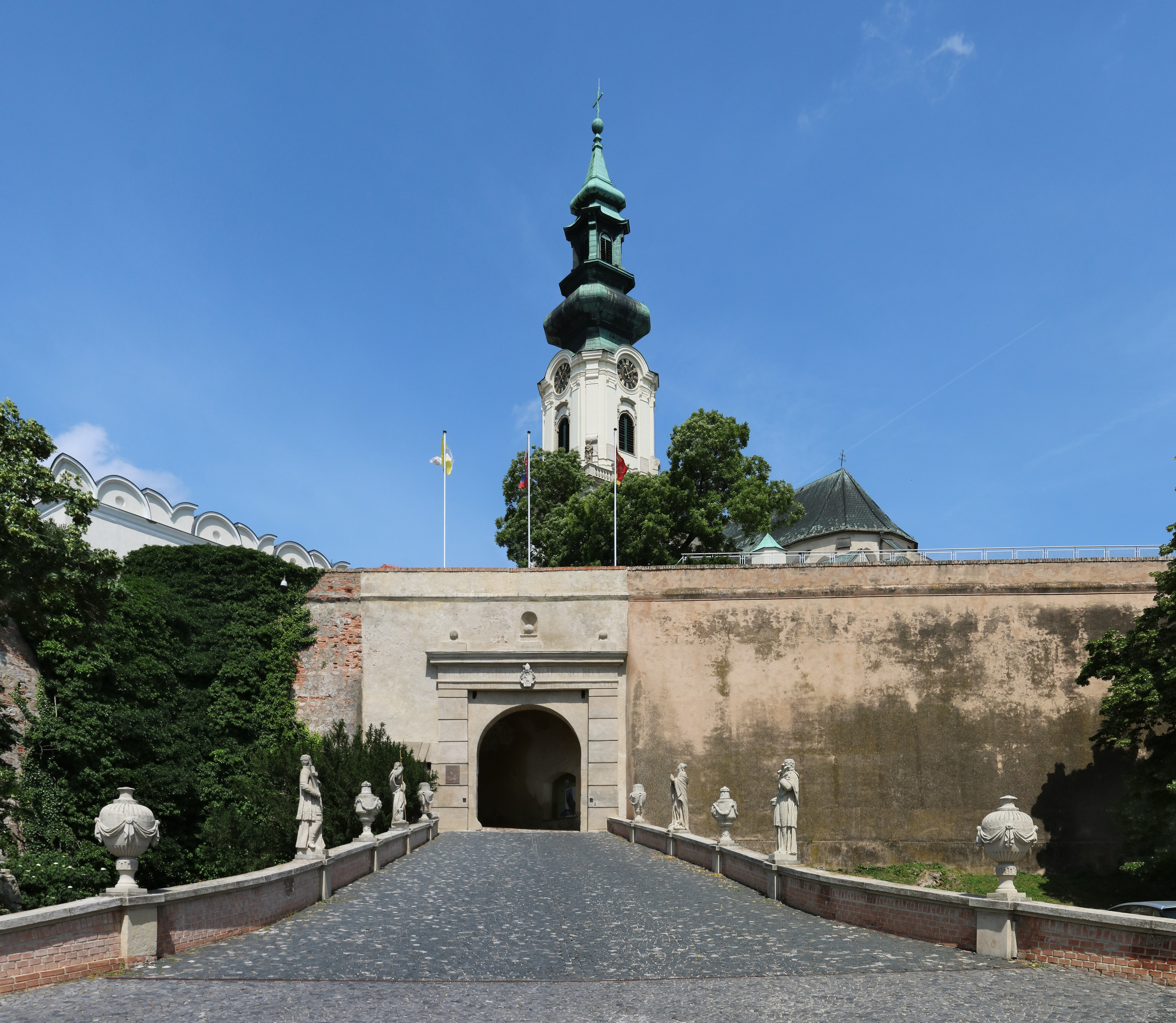
Nitra Castle

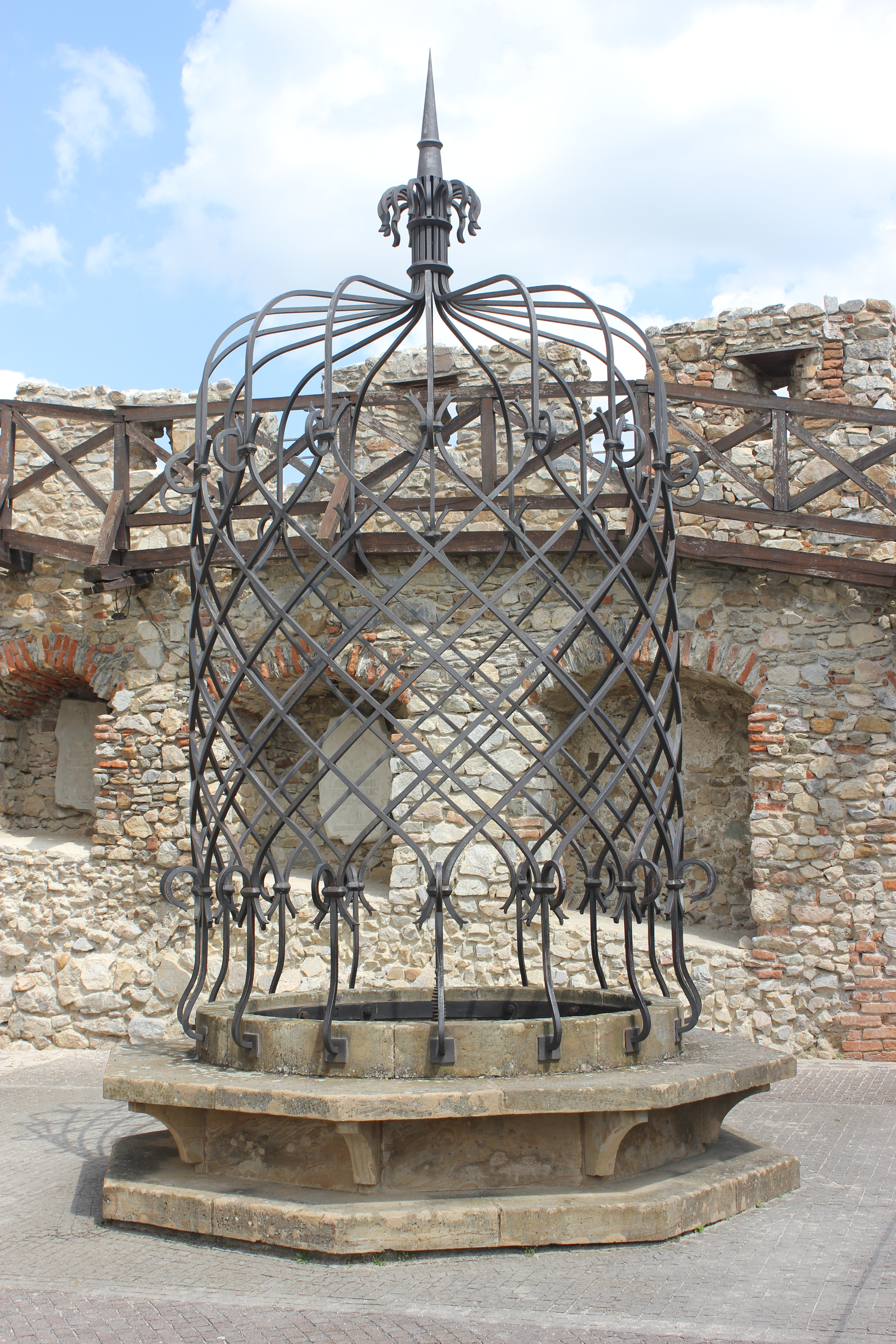
Wishing Well at Nitra Castle

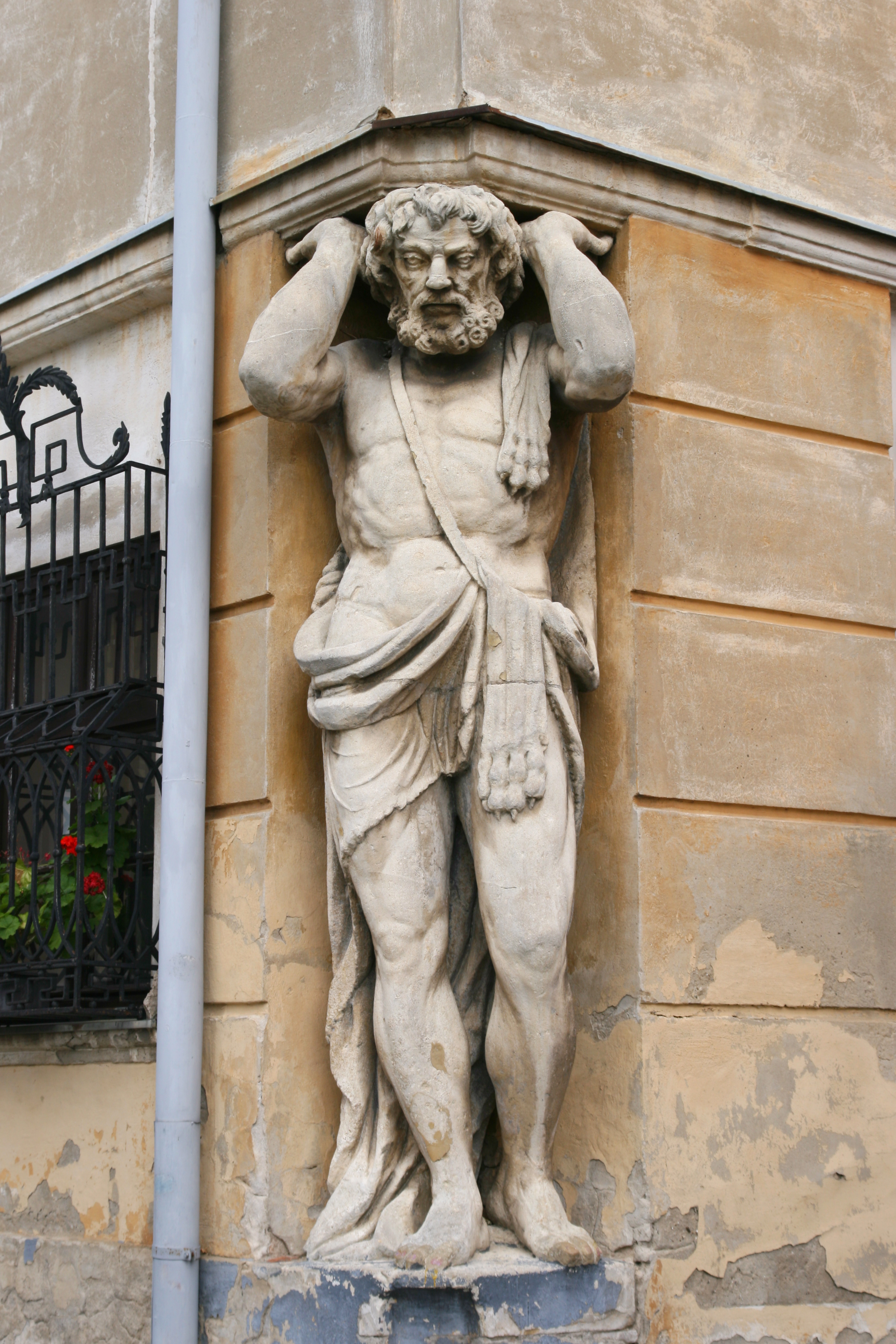
Corgoň Statue

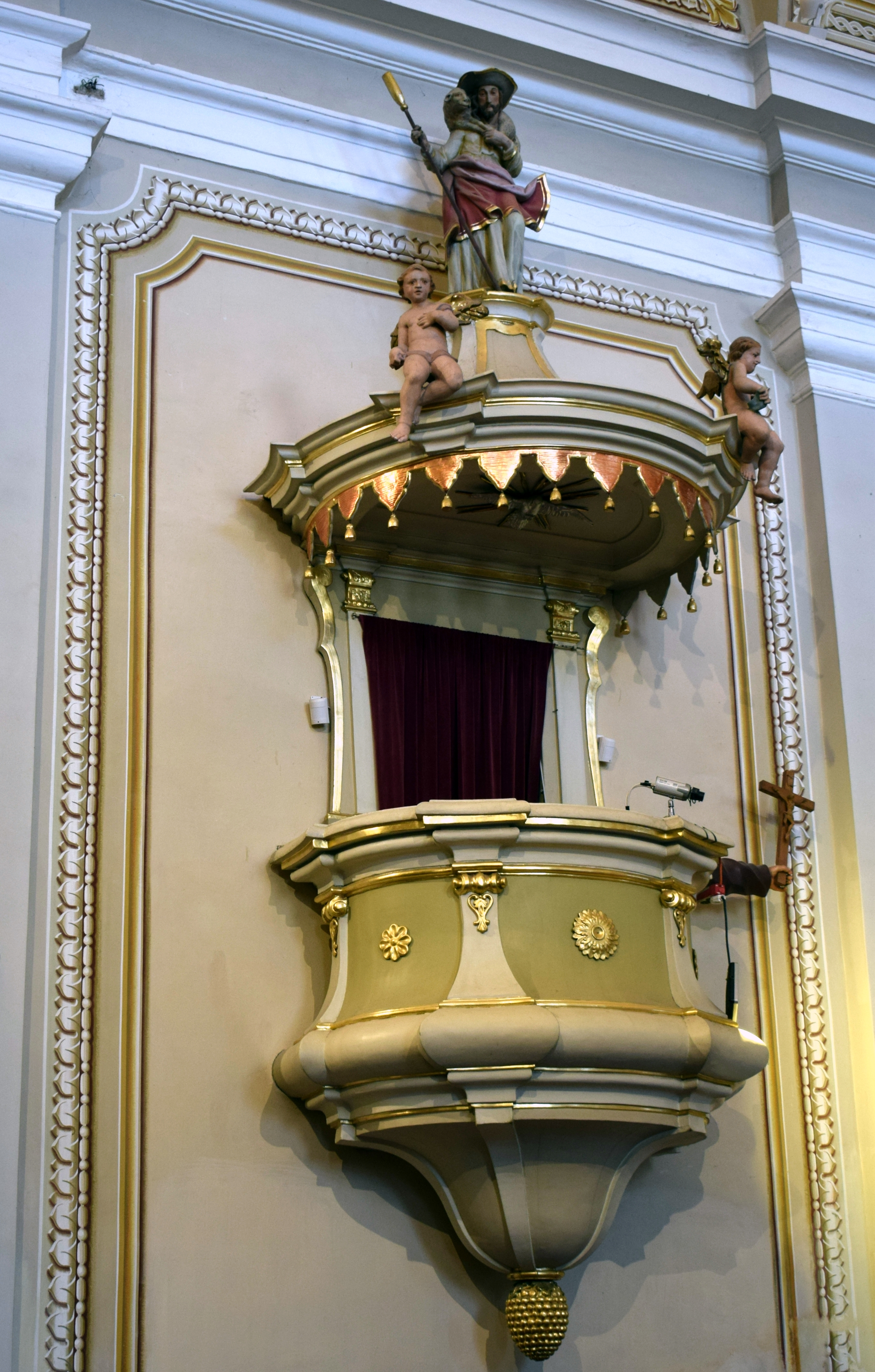
Pulpit at St. Peter and Paul Church

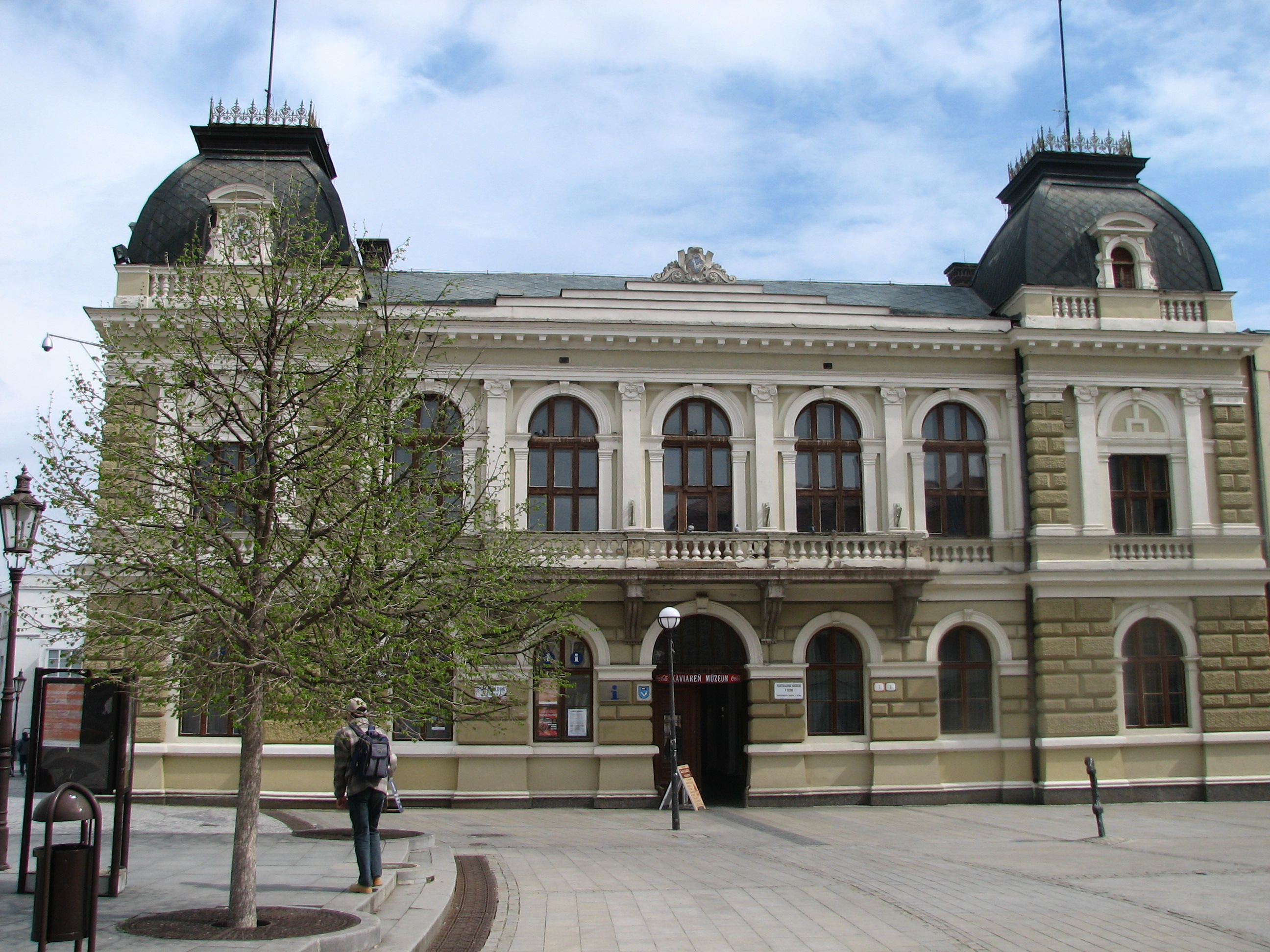
City Hall

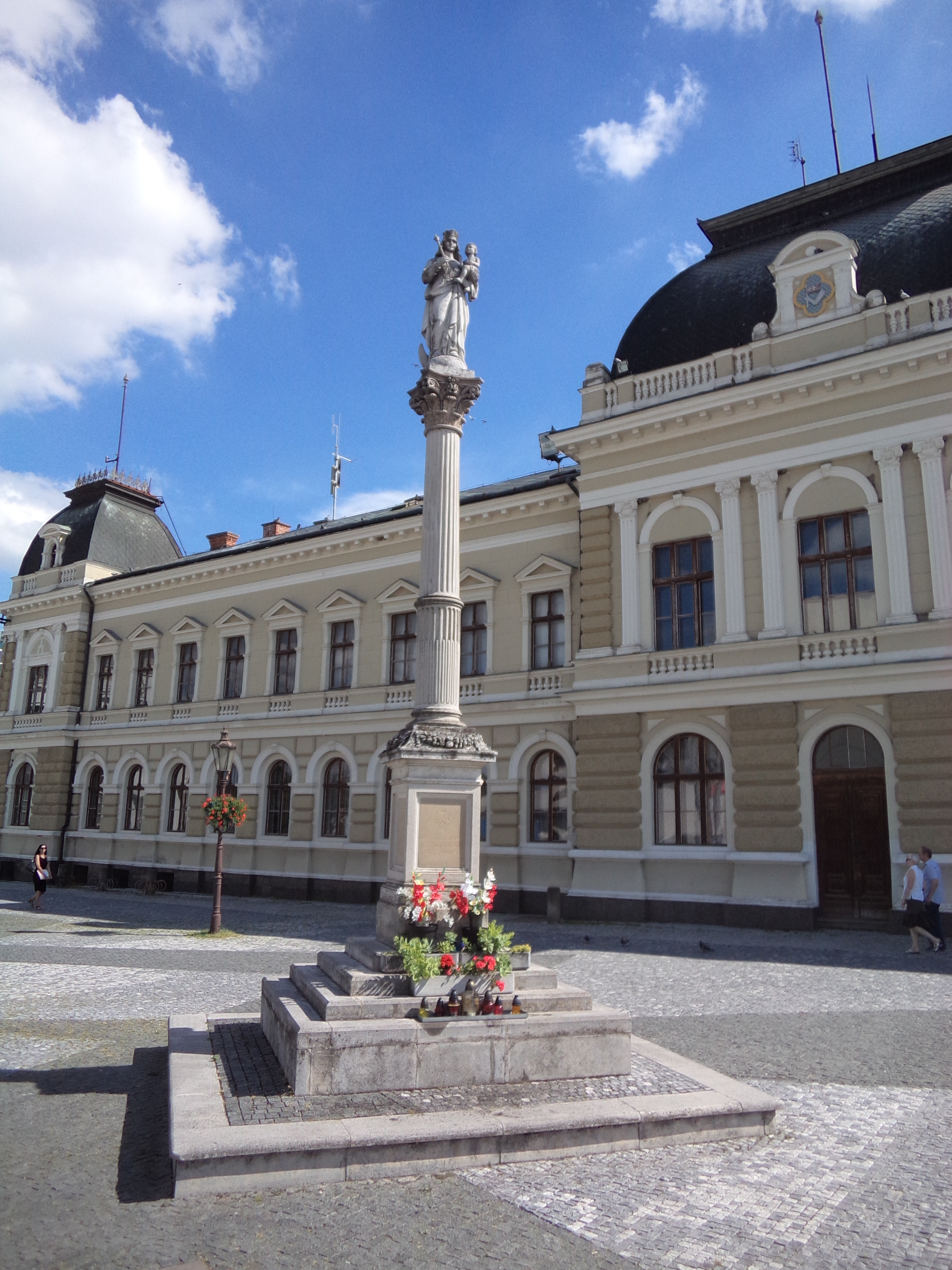
Marian column on Svätopluk Square

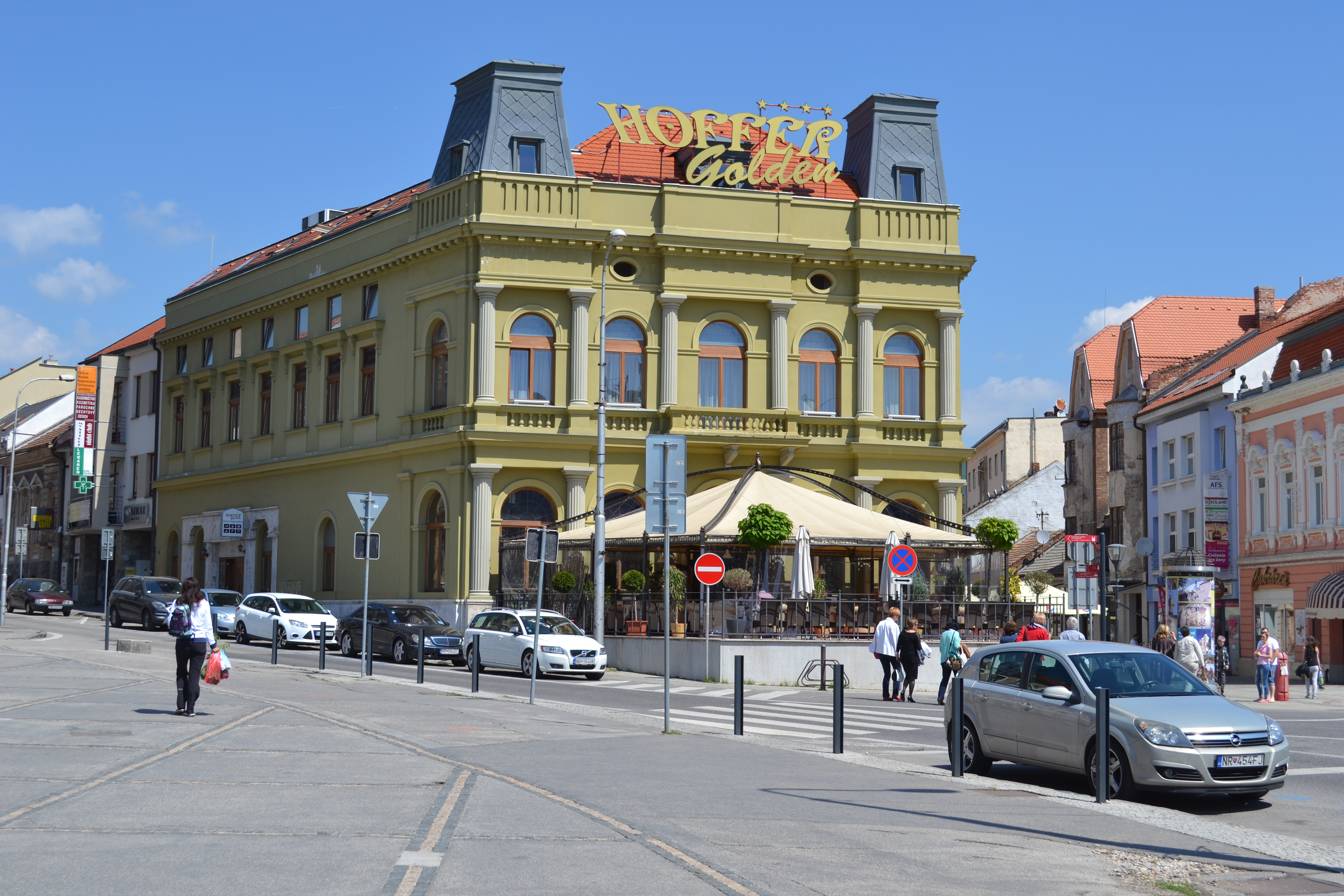
Hotel Golden

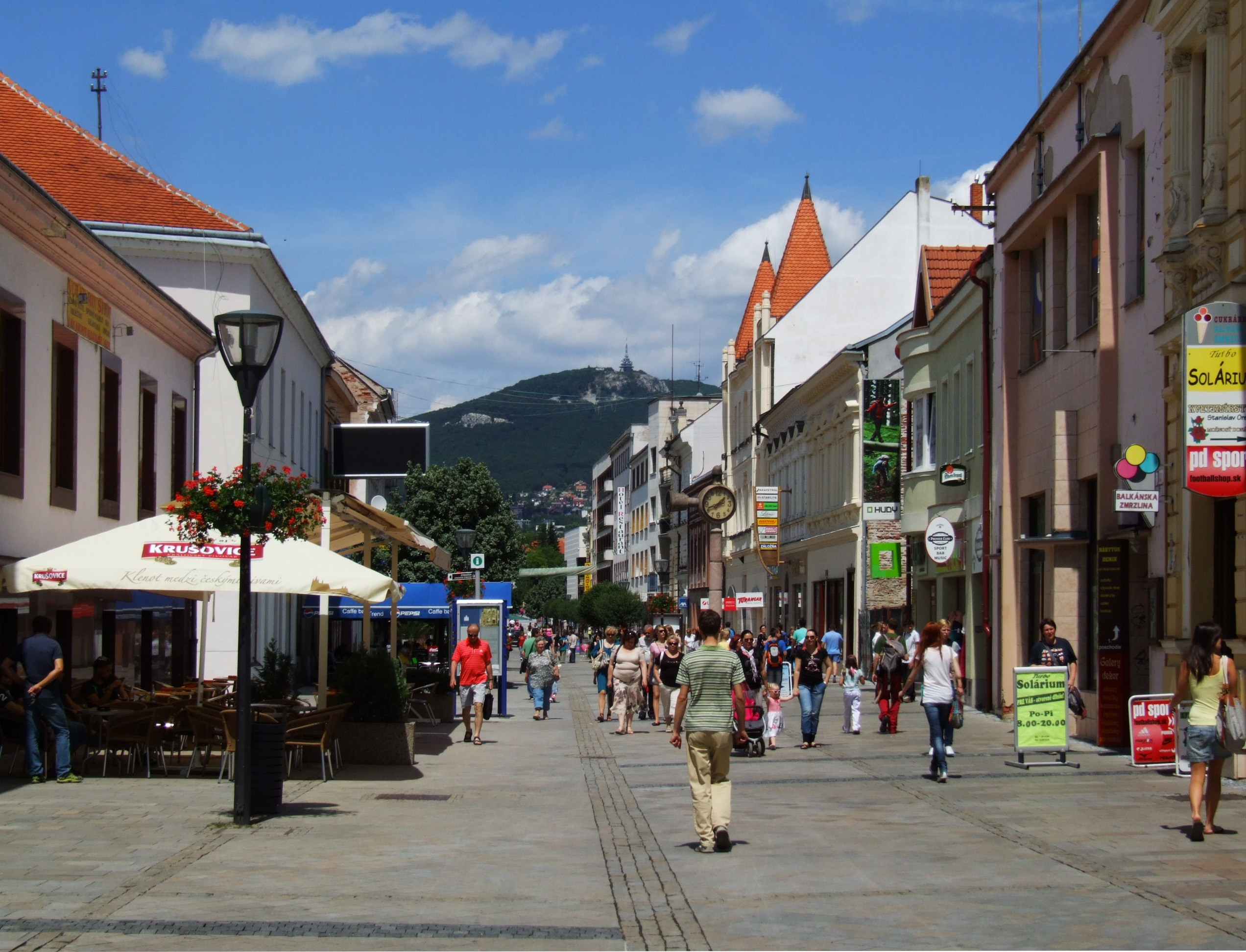
Štefánik Street

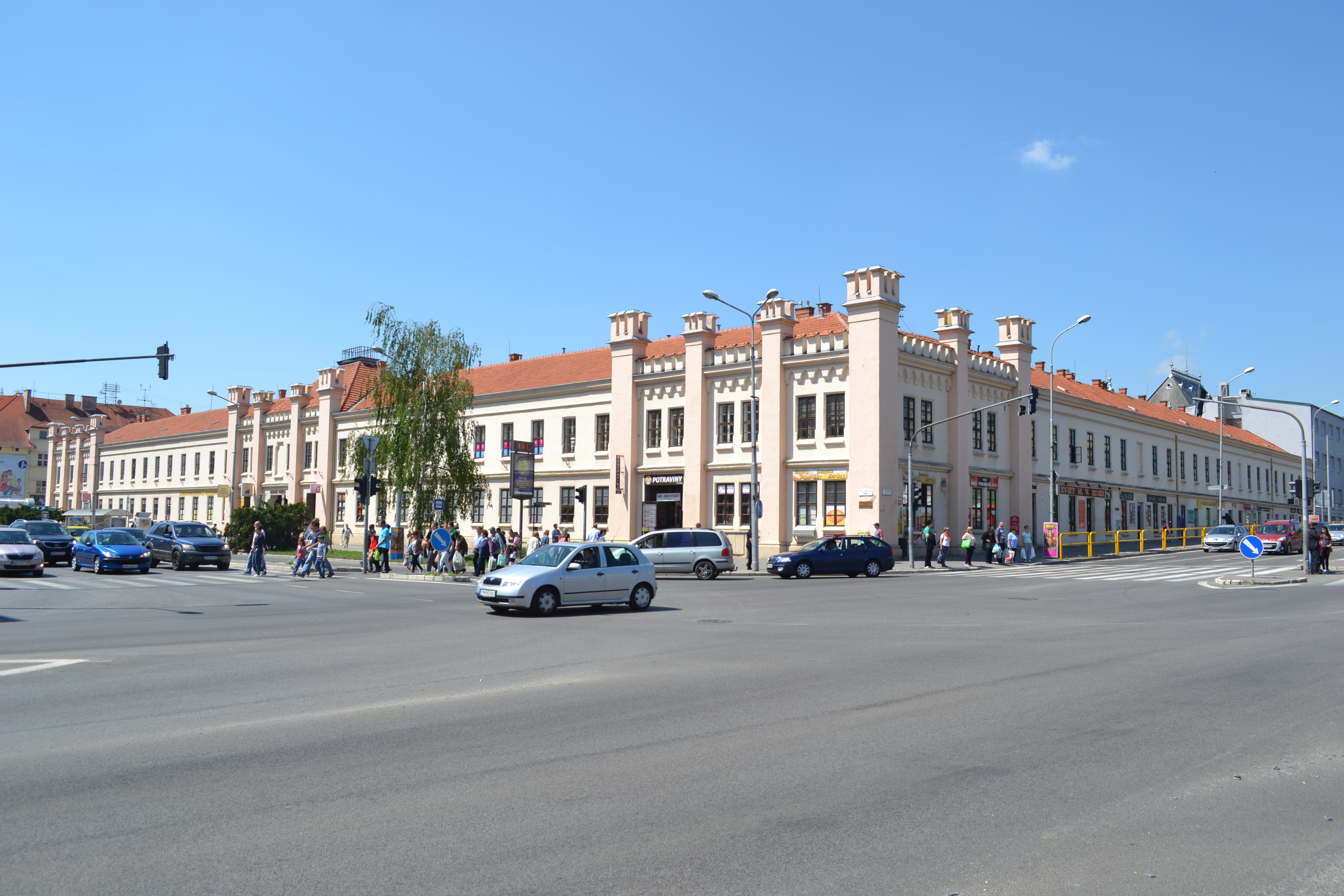
City Market

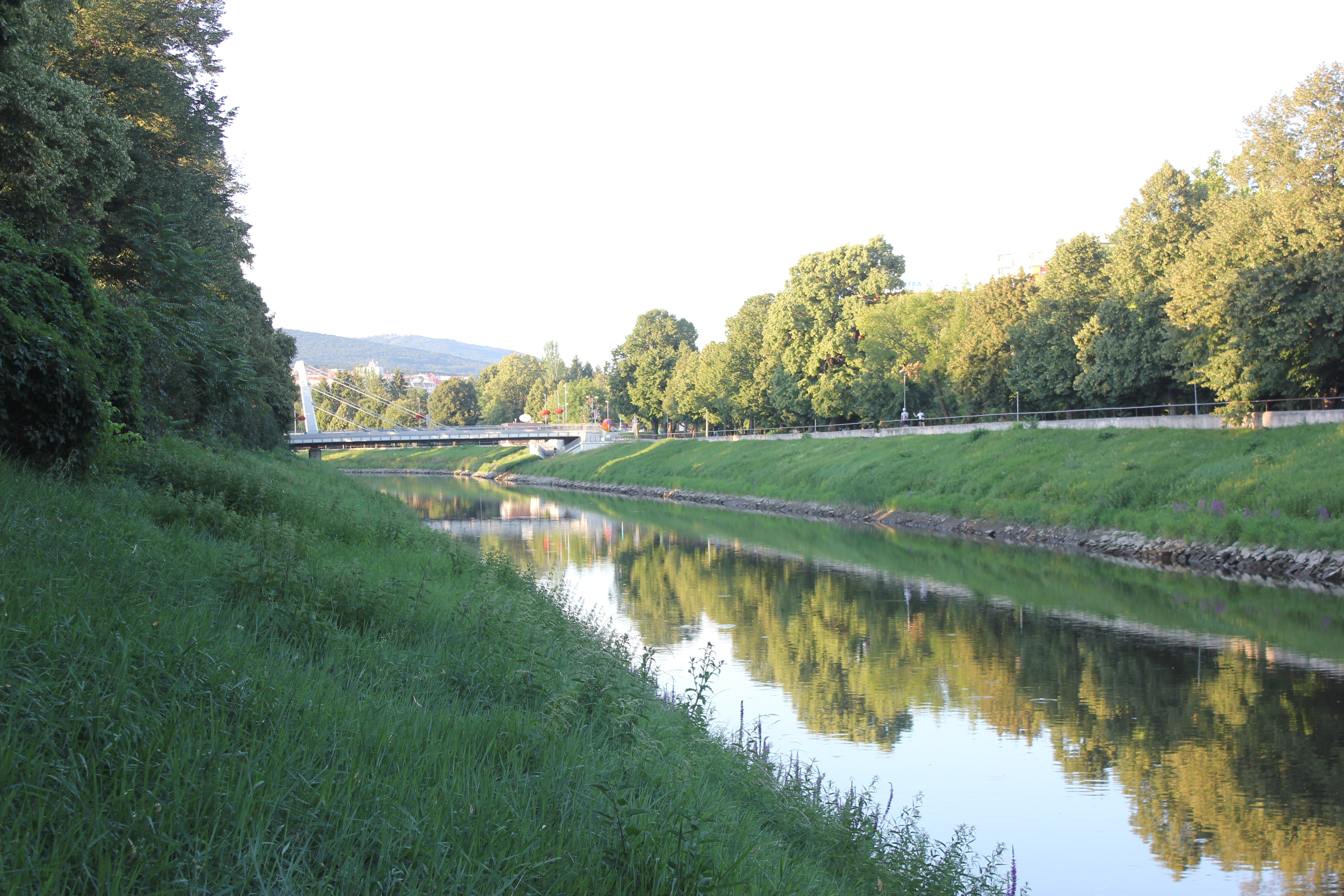
Nitra River

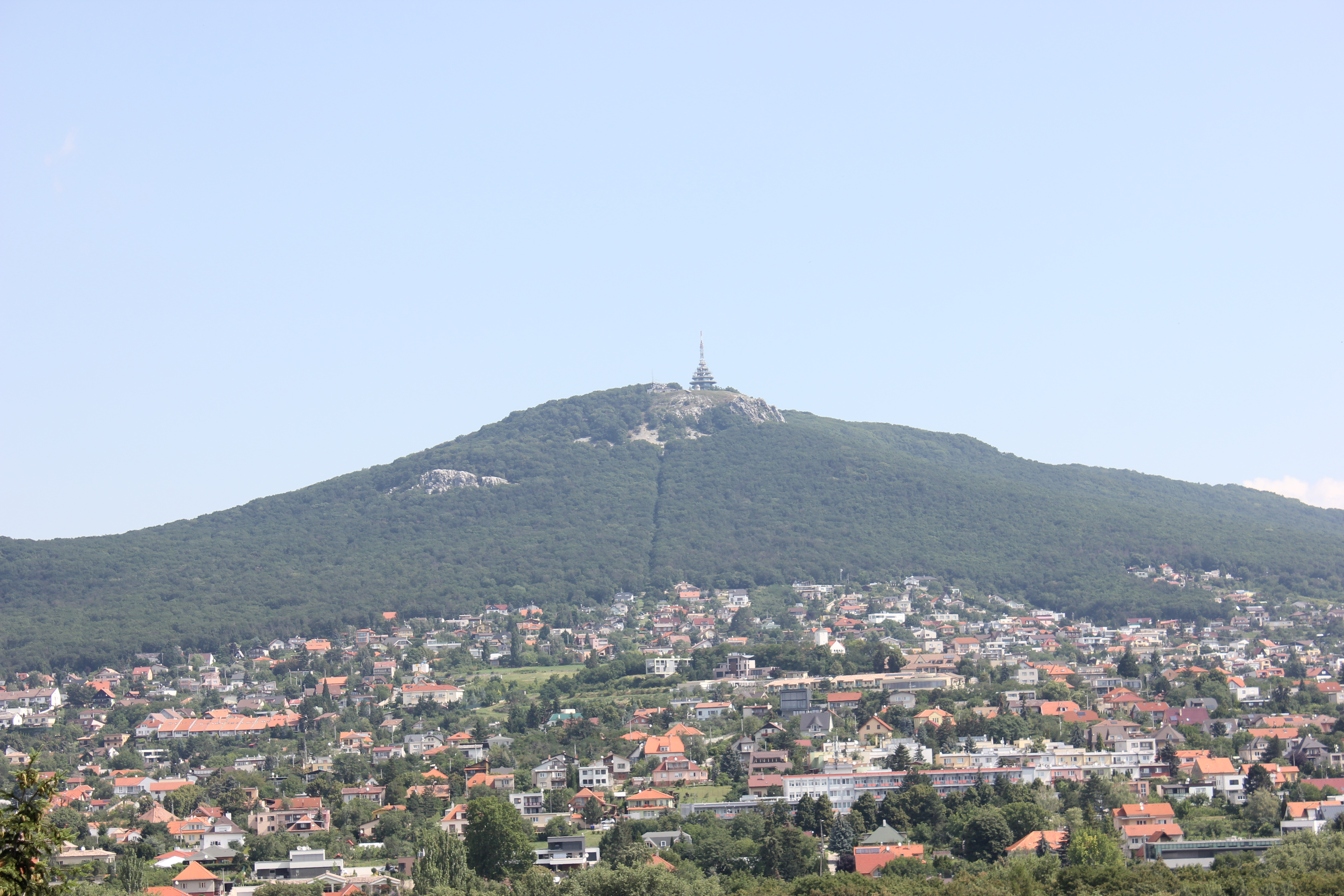
Zobor Mountain

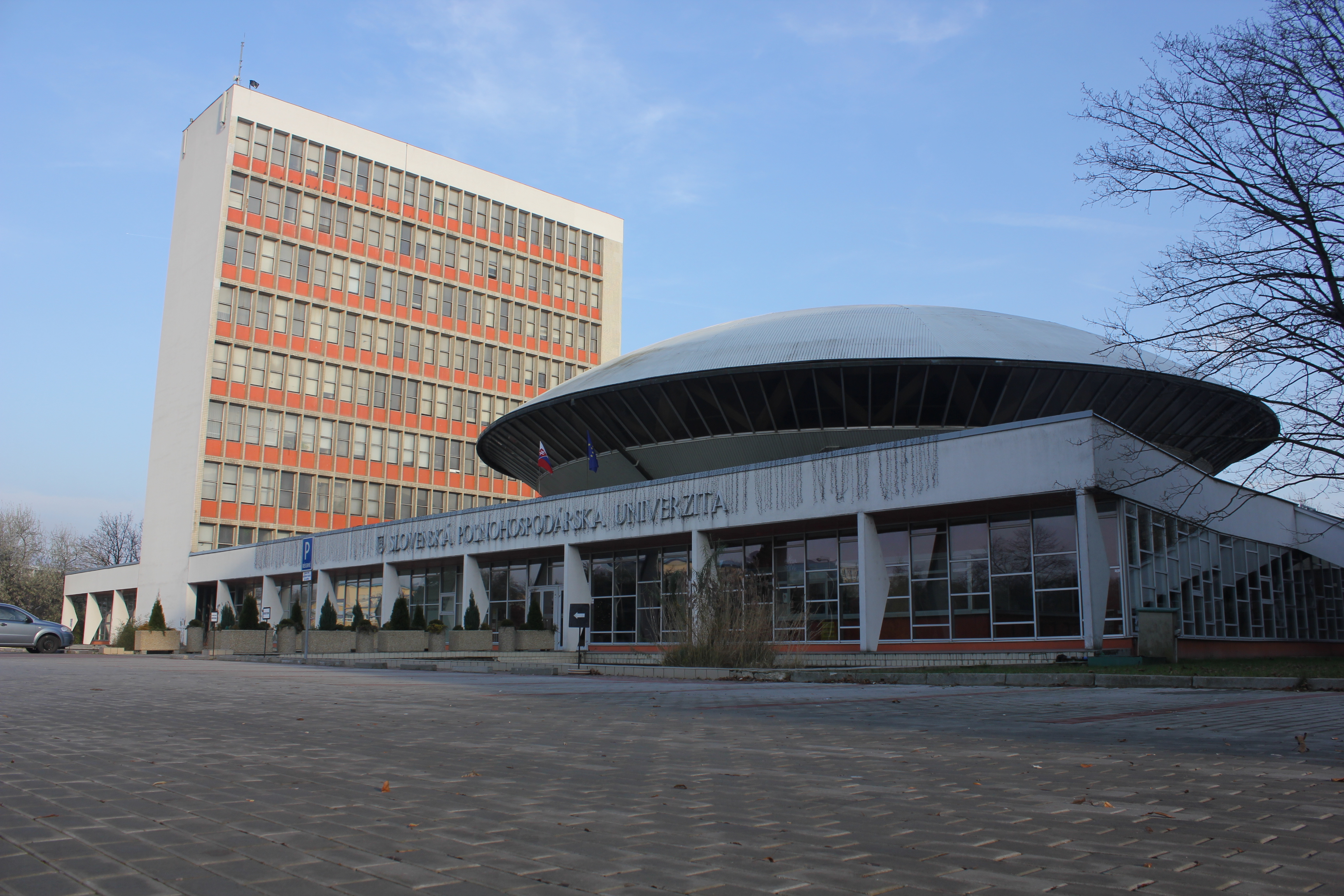
Slovak University of Agriculture
