= Armilla =

Armilla may refer to:

- metallic objects :
  - Latin name for a bracelet in Antiquity, also applied to Greeks, Celts and other peoples
  - Armilla (military decoration), an armband awarded as a medal-equivalent to soldiers of ancient Rome
  - Armilla or armill, a medieval arm or wristband, usually an item of liturgical or ceremonial jewellery
  - Armillary sphere
- Armilla, Granada, a Spanish municipality in the Andalusian province of Granada
- Armilla Patrol, the British Royal Navy's permanent presence in the Persian Gulf during the 1980s and 1990s
- Armilla (genus), a flatworm genus in the family Dendrocoelidae
