= Nitra railway station =

Railway station in Nitra, Slovakia

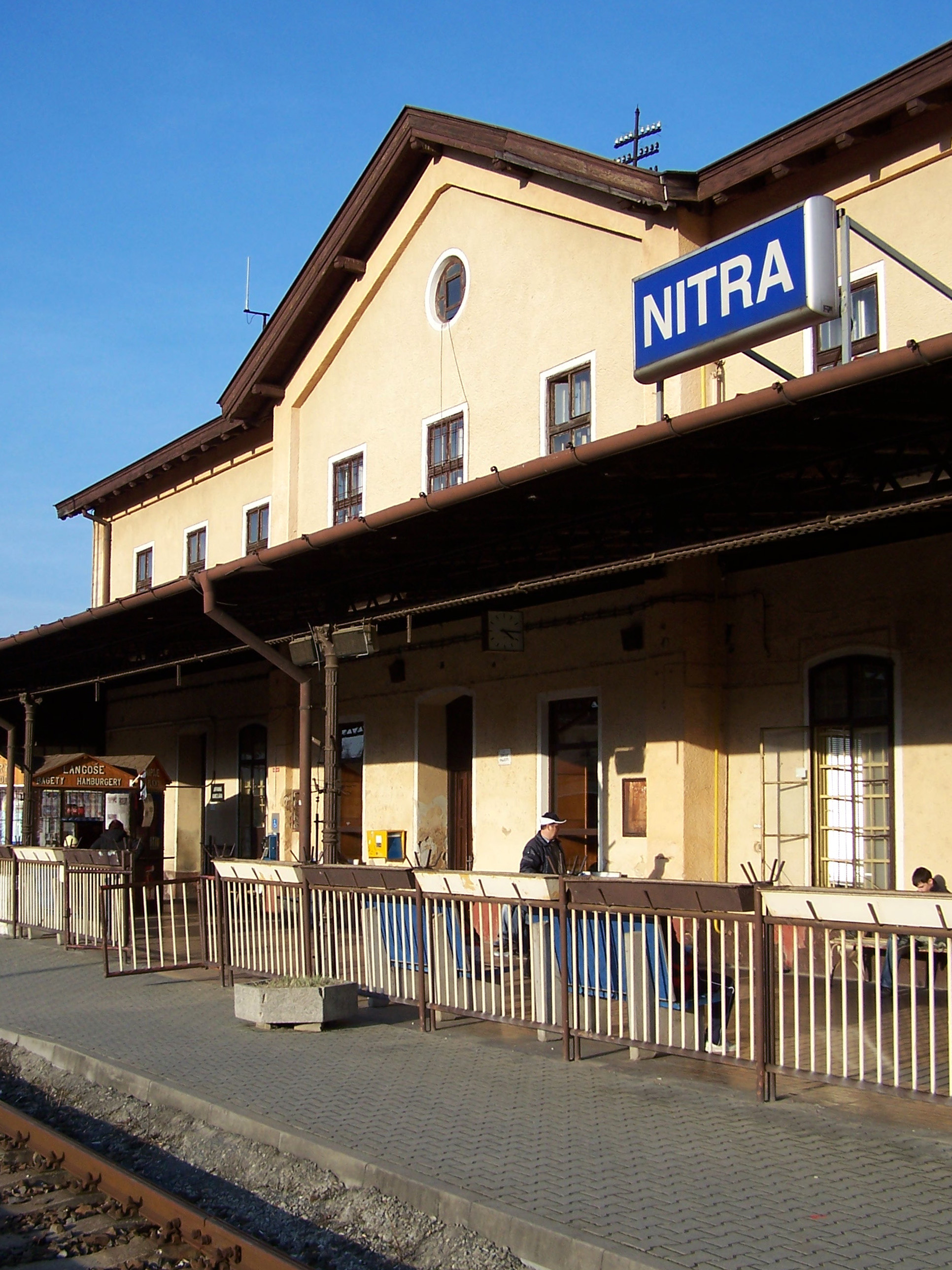
- Railway station in Nitra

General information
- Location: Železničná stanica 949 01 Nitra; Nitra Region; Slovakia
- Coordinates: 48°18′05″N 18°04′46″E
- Owner: Železnice Slovenskej republiky (ŽSR)
- Operator: Železnice Slovenskej republiky
- Line: Nové Zámky - Prievidza (140)
- Platforms: 3

History
- Opened: 1876
Location
- Location within Slovakia

Nitra railway station is situated at Staničná street in the Staré Mesto district of Nitra, Slovakia. Nearby is a busy bus station and a bus stop served by the city's public transport network. Nitra is nowadays out of main railway corridors and the significance of railway transport is only regional.

== History ==
The history of railways in Nitra dates back to the second half of the nineteenth century. Track section Ivanka pri Nitre (Nyitraivánka) - Nitra (Nyitra) was opened in 1876 and connected Nitra (Nyitra) with tracks Šurany (Nagysurány) - Ivanka pri Nitre (Nyitraivánka) and Palárikovo (Tótmegyer) - Šurany (Nagysurány). Railway to Topoľčany (Nagytapolcsány) was opened in 1881 and local track Nitra - Zbehy (Izbék) - Radošina (Radosna) in 1909.

Main building was built around 1876, and extended with dispatchers' offices in 1921. Today's look of the building originates in 1925, after the electrification of station lights was finished.

== Reconstruction ==
The railway station is scheduled to undertake complete reconstruction in 2014–2015. The approximate budget for the reconstruction is €4 150 000 without value added tax. Because of 2008 financial crisis and lack of funds at ŽSR (Železnice Slovenskej Republiky), the future of this project remains unclear.

== Services ==
Preceding station	ŽSSK	Following station
Nitra zastávka toward Topoľčany or Leopoldov	Stopping trains	Dolné Krškany toward Nové Zámky
