= Limburg Staurotheke =

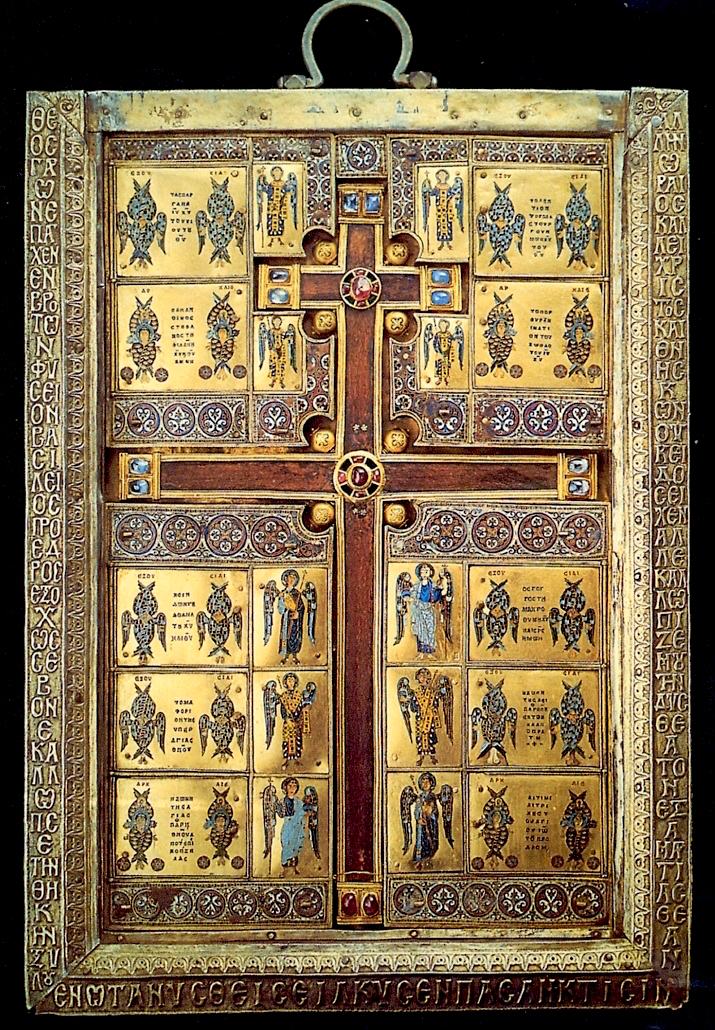
The interior of the Limburg Staurotheke with the True Cross reliquary in place.

The Limburg Staurotheke (from Greek σταυρός stauros, "cross" and θήκη theke "container") is an example of a Byzantine reliquary, one of the best surviving examples of Byzantine enamel, in the cloisonné technique. It was made sometime in the mid to late 10th century in Constantinople. The box measures 48 cm (19 in) by 38 cm (15 in) and has a depth of 6 cm (2.4 in). This reliquary design was common in Byzantium beginning in the 9th century. It was probably brought to Germany as loot from the Fourth Crusade, and is now in the diocesan museum of Limburg an der Lahn in Hesse, Germany.

The Limburg Staurotheke consists of two parts that were made at separate times. The removable, double-armed cross was made first and holds seven fragments of the True Cross in the middle of the cross where its main set of arms meets. The cross is made out of sycamore wood and is entirely covered in gilded silver and embellished with gemstones and pearls. Inscribed on the back of the cross is the following verse:

God stretched out his hands upon the wood,
gushing forth through it the energies of life.
And Constantine and Romanos the emperors
have with the addition of radiant stones and pearls
made this same full of wonder.
Upon it Christ formerly smashed the gates of hell,
giving new life to the dead.
And the crowned ones who have now adorned it,
crush with it the temerities of the barbarians

The two emperors mentioned in the inscription are Constantine VII Porphyrogennetos and Romanos II, his son. They ruled jointly from 945 to 959, meaning that the cross would have been constructed during their rule.

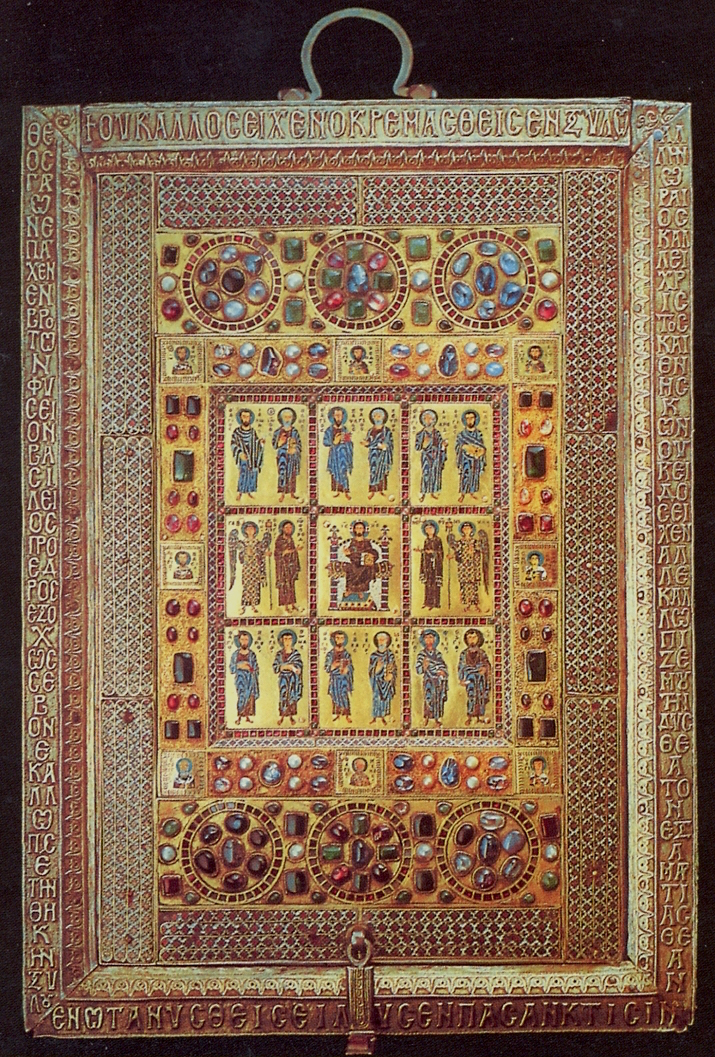
The lid of the Limburg Staurotheke

The box and its sliding, removable lid were made second and is designed to hold the cross reliquary in the center of the box. Surrounding the cross are ten enamel panels that depict angels wearing court outfits. Next to the angels are 10 more panels that each depict a pair of either cherubim or seraphim. The panels depicting the cherubim and seraphim are the containers that hold ten relics and each compartment has an inscription that identifies the relic housed inside. Six relics are Passion relics and are ascribed to Christ, three to the Virgin Mary, and one to John the Baptist. The relics in the compartments of the theke are:

- The swaddling clothes of Jesus
- The sponge used to give Christ water during his crucifixion
- The crown of thorns worn by Christ during his crucifixion
- The winding sheet Christ was wrapped in while in his tomb
- The towel used by Christ to wash the feet of his Apostles during the Last Supper
- The purple himation worn by Christ during his crucifixion (mentioned in John 19:2)
- The belt of the Virgin Mary from Chalkoprateia
- The belt of the Virgin Mary brought from Zela
- The maphorion of the Virgin Mary
- Locks of hair from St. John the Baptist

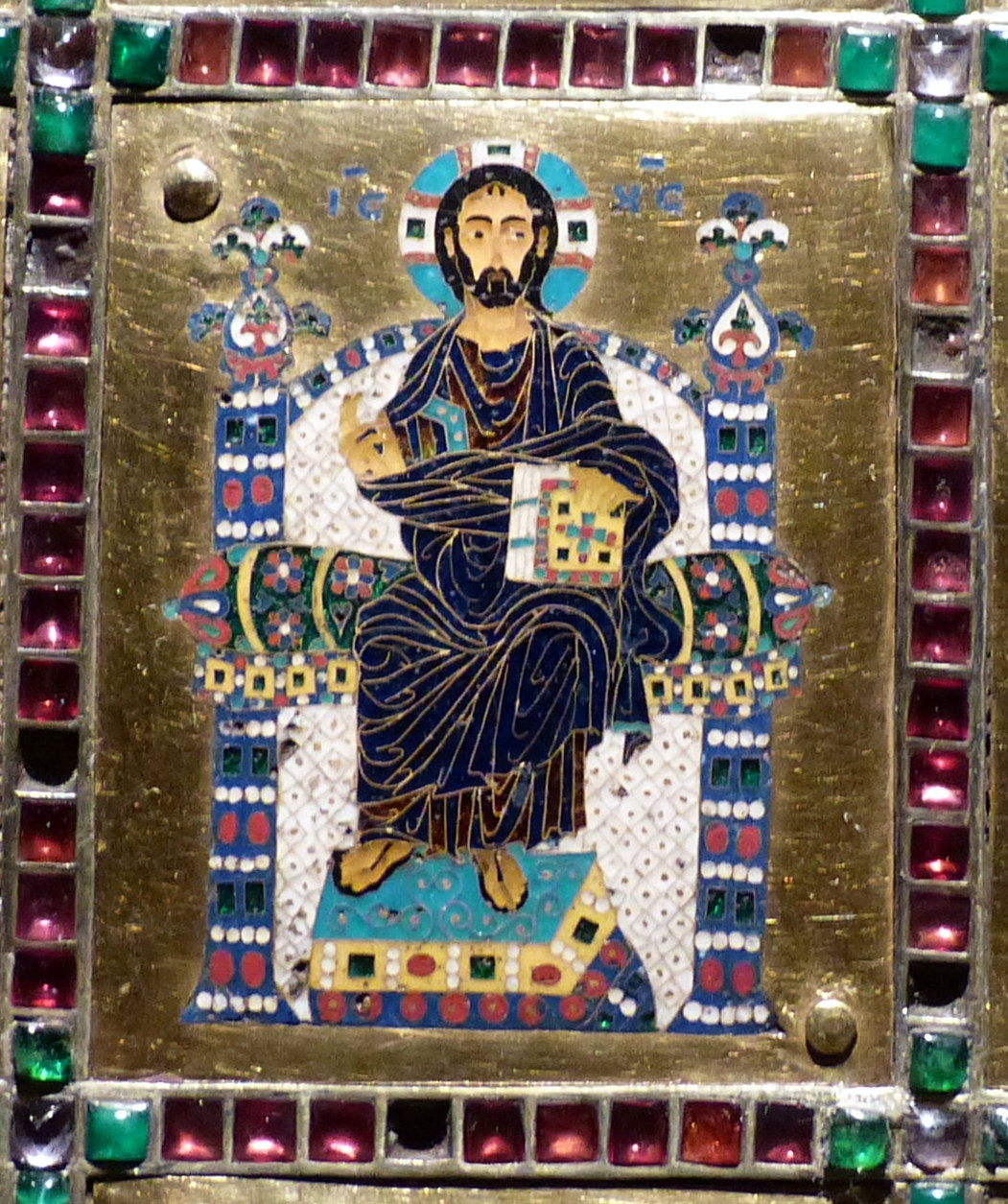
Close up of Christ Pantocrator on the middle enamel panel of the lid of the Limburg Staurotheke

The lid of the box, like the cross and inner compartments of the theke, is covered in gilded silver and lavishly decorated with gemstones. It features nine enamel panels that portray the Deesis, a scene that depicts Christ in a throne, accompanied by the Virgin Mary and St. John the Baptist and surrounded by angels. On the lid of the Limburg Staurotheke, Christ is seen in the middle panel, with John the Baptist to his left and the Virgin Mary to his right. The archangels Gabriel and Michael stand next to John the Baptist and the Virgin Mary. The top and bottom panels portray the twelve Apostles. On an outer border framing the panels are the busts of eight unidentified figures, though they are likely images of four military saints and four important church leaders. The theke itself features an inscription on the outer rim that states:

No beauty had He, who was hanged on the Wood,
and yet, even in death, Christ surpassed all beauty.
While He had no comely form, He embellished my
unsightly face disfigured by sin and transgression.
For, though He was God, He suffered in mortals’ nature.
Since Basil the Proedros highly revered Him,
he greatly embellished the box of the wood,
on which He was stretched and embraced all creation.

The inscription reveals that Basil Lekapenos was the benefactor of the staurotheke. Basil was the bastard son of Emperor Romanos I Lekapenos and was made a eunuch likely as a child. He would become a powerful figure in the imperial court. Emperor Nikephoros II Phokas gave him the title of proedros in 963. The theke was likely made between 963 and 985, when Basil was exiled from the imperial court.
