= Beresford Hope Cross =

9th-century Byzantine reliquary cross

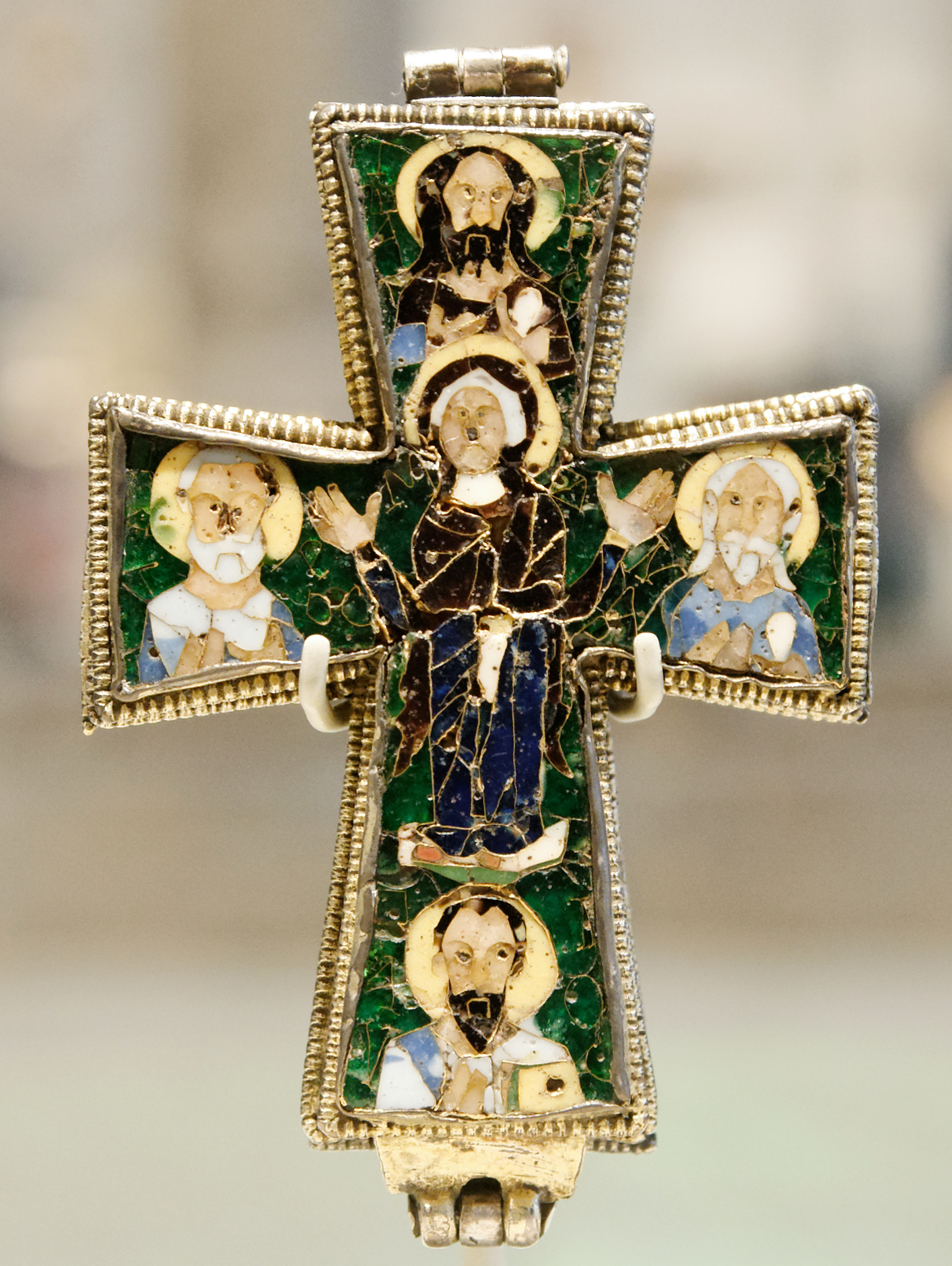
One side of the Beresford Hope Cross, circa 9th century, depicting the Virgin Mary praying flanked by busts of four saints

The Beresford Hope Cross is a 9th-century Byzantine reliquary cross with cloisonné enamel. It was intended to be worn as a pectoral crucifix, perhaps holding a fragment of the True Cross in the compartment inside. The cross is thought to have been made in southern Italy around the end of Byzantine iconoclasm, between 843 and the mid tenth century. It has been in the Victoria and Albert Museum in London since 1886.

== Description ==
The cross is made from gold, enamel, and silver gilt, and measures approximately 8.7 by 5.8 by 1.8 centimetres (3.43 in × 2.28 in × 0.71 in). It has a hinge at the top and catch at the bottom of the cross, so it can be opened to permit a small object to be placed in the cavity within, presumably a relic.

One side of the cross depicts Christ on the cross, with busts of the Virgin Mary on one side and of Joseph on the other. Below Christ's feet is a skull, possibly that of Adam. Above Christ's head is an inscription and the Sun and Moon. At the centre of the cross, where Christ's chest and torso would be, is a hole. The arms of the cross also bear faint Greek inscriptions,

The other side of the cross shows the Virgin Mary, standing with hands raised in prayer, flanked by busts of the saints Peter and Andrew, as Mary and Joseph were on the other side, with busts of John the Baptist above and Paul below.

== Reliquary crosses ==
Reliquary crosses contained objects from a holy place or person, and would often be worn as pendants. In the Beresford Hope cross, the hole in what would be Christ's torso is where this relic would have been placed. These articles were worn by a pious person, often someone high up in the church hierarchy.

This specific cross was probably one of the first of its kind, and led the way for future reliquary crosses, at least in this part of the world. It is also possible that this cross held a piece of the True Cross, which was said to have been discovered in Jerusalem during Constantine's reign.

== Cloisonné ==
Cloisonné is not an easy technique, but it is often seen in jewellery. Byzantine artists found it one of the best ways to depict their religious icons, and render them realistically. Cloisonné is made by using thin strips of gold or other metal to outline a shape. The shape is then filled with glass mixed with pigment as a paste, and then fired to solidify it. It is then ground down, and polished. The medium is not good at rendering small detail and is more commonly used for geometric or vegetal subjects such as flowers, vines, or fruit, and not human forms. Colour can be hard to get right, and shapes can lose their form, making human faces look melted. We can see this in the Beresford Hope Cross, as the faces of Jesus, Mary, Joseph, etc., have almost muddy looking faces, without much detail.

== Provenance ==
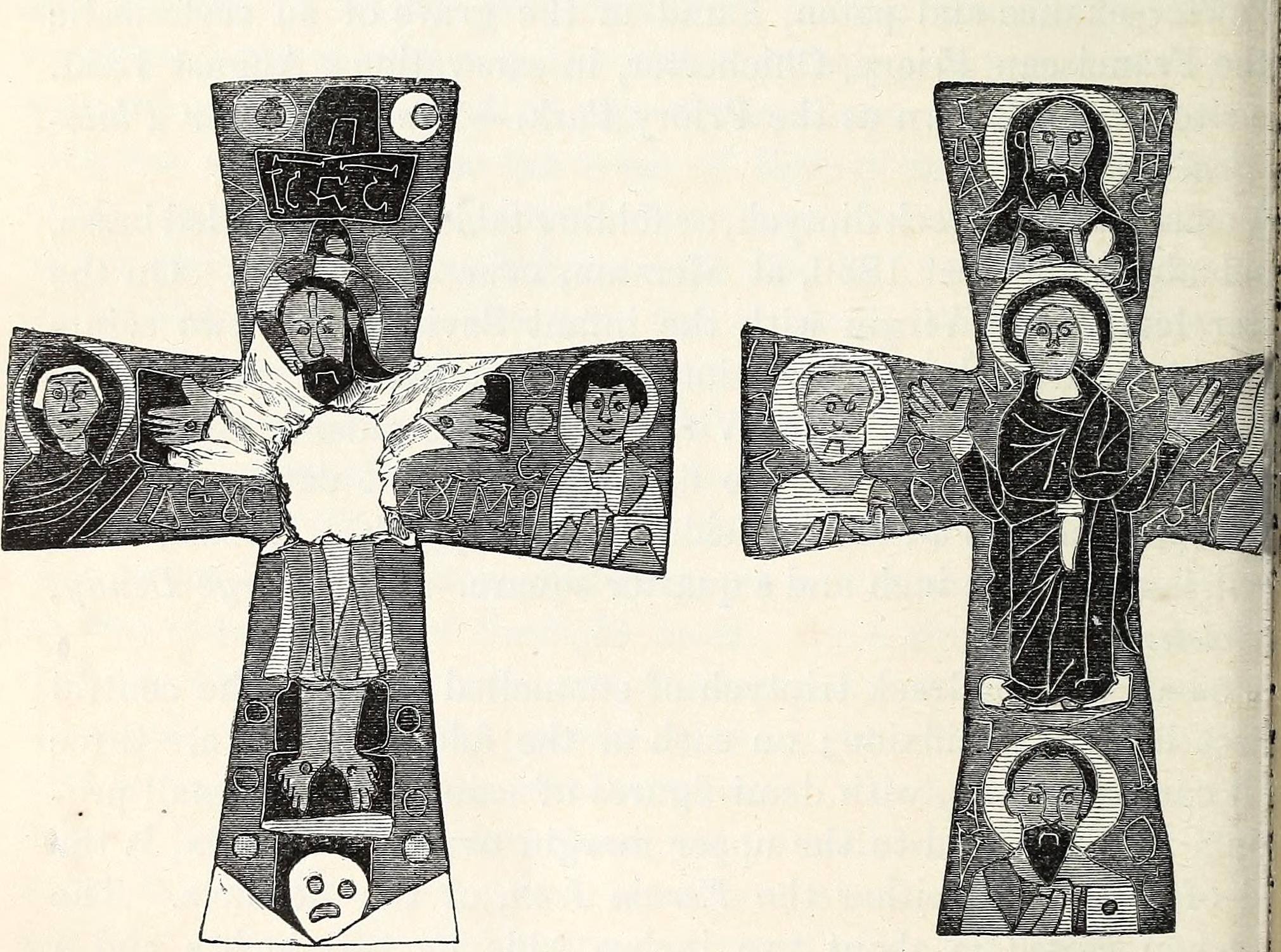
Drawings from 1856

The cross was probably made somewhere in southern Italy. Early Byzantine enamels before 726 used a filigree technique, but cloisonné became dominant later. The shade of translucent green enamel used as a body colour indicates a date between 843, when the period of Byzantine iconoclasm ended, to the mid tenth century.

Based on the relatively crude depictions of Christ, Mary, and the saints, and the way the craftsman completed the work, scholars have concluded that the cross was made by an Eastern craftsman in a Western city. This could mean the craftsman was someone from the East who moved West during iconoclasm, or perhaps someone who had studied under an Eastern craftsman before practising their trade in the West. It is presumed that the cross was made in a much more isolated location than other crosses from the same time period. It has some stylistic similarities to the reliquary box known as the Fieschi Morgan Staurotheke, but is even more crude.

It was first documented in a catalogue of the collection of Louis Fidel Debruge-Duménil (1788-1838), published in 1847. It was acquired by Mr. J.H. Beresford Hope. His collection was sold by Alexander Beresford-Hope at Christie's in May 1886, when the cross was acquired for the Victoria and Albert Museum.
