= Monomachus Crown =

Byzantine crown

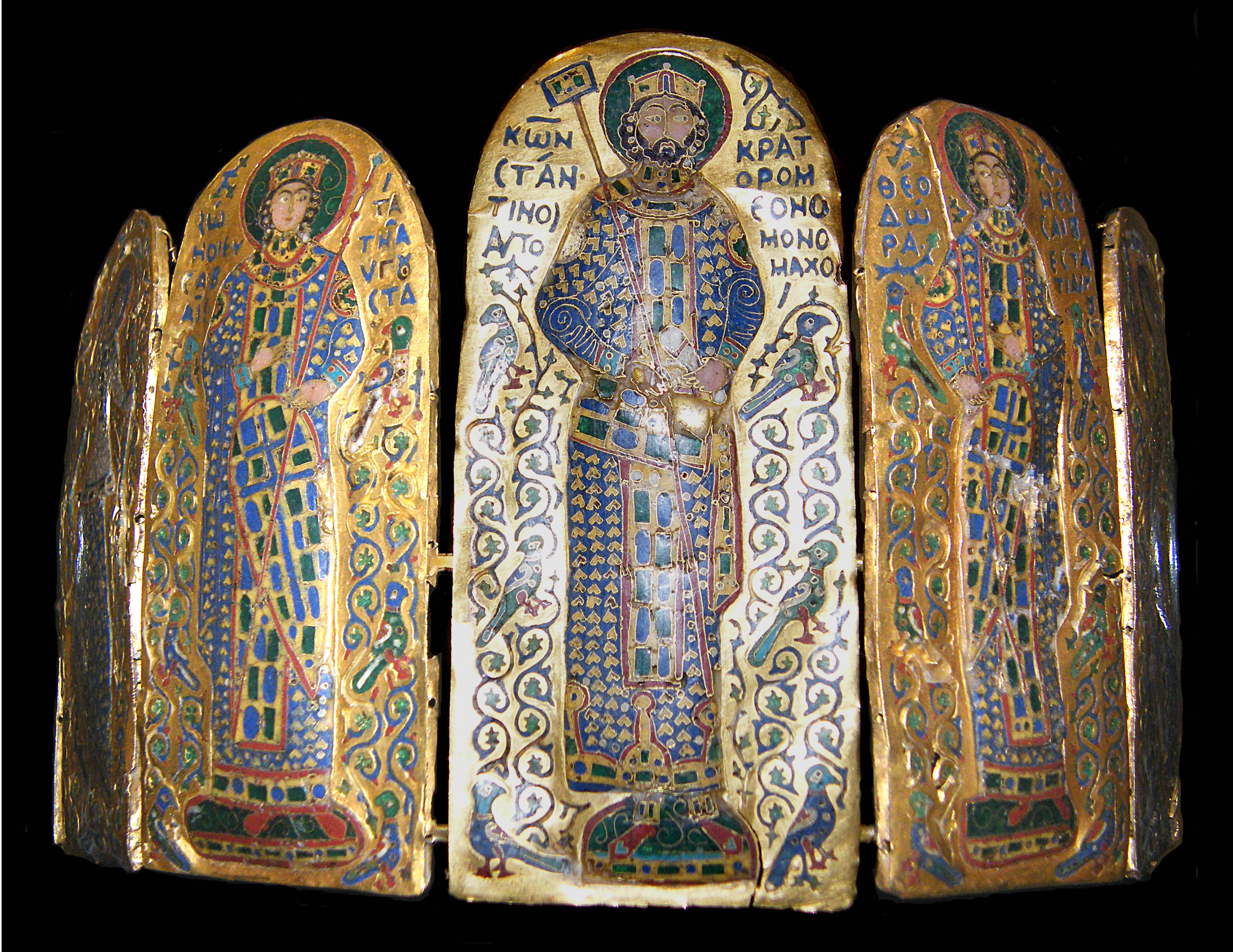
The Monomachus Crown

The Monomachus Crown (Greek: Στέμμα του Μονομάχου; Hungarian: Monomakhosz-korona) is a set of pieces of engraved Byzantine goldwork, decorated with cloisonné enamel, in the Hungarian National Museum in Budapest, Hungary. It consists of seven gold plates depicting Byzantine Emperor Constantine IX Monomachus, his wife Zoe, her sister Theodora, two dancers and two allegorical figures. Two gold medallions enamelled with saints and a small piece with cut glass in a setting were also found; probably they did not form part of the same object. The group has puzzling aspects that have long made it the subject of scholarly debate; it was probably made in Constantinople in 1042.

The group was unearthed in 1860 by a farmer in what is now called Ivanka pri Nitre in Slovakia, then Nyitraivánka in Hungary. If it is a crown, it is, with the Holy Crown of Hungary of a few decades later (also in Budapest) and the kamelaukion of Constance of Aragon, one of only three surviving Byzantine crowns.

== History ==
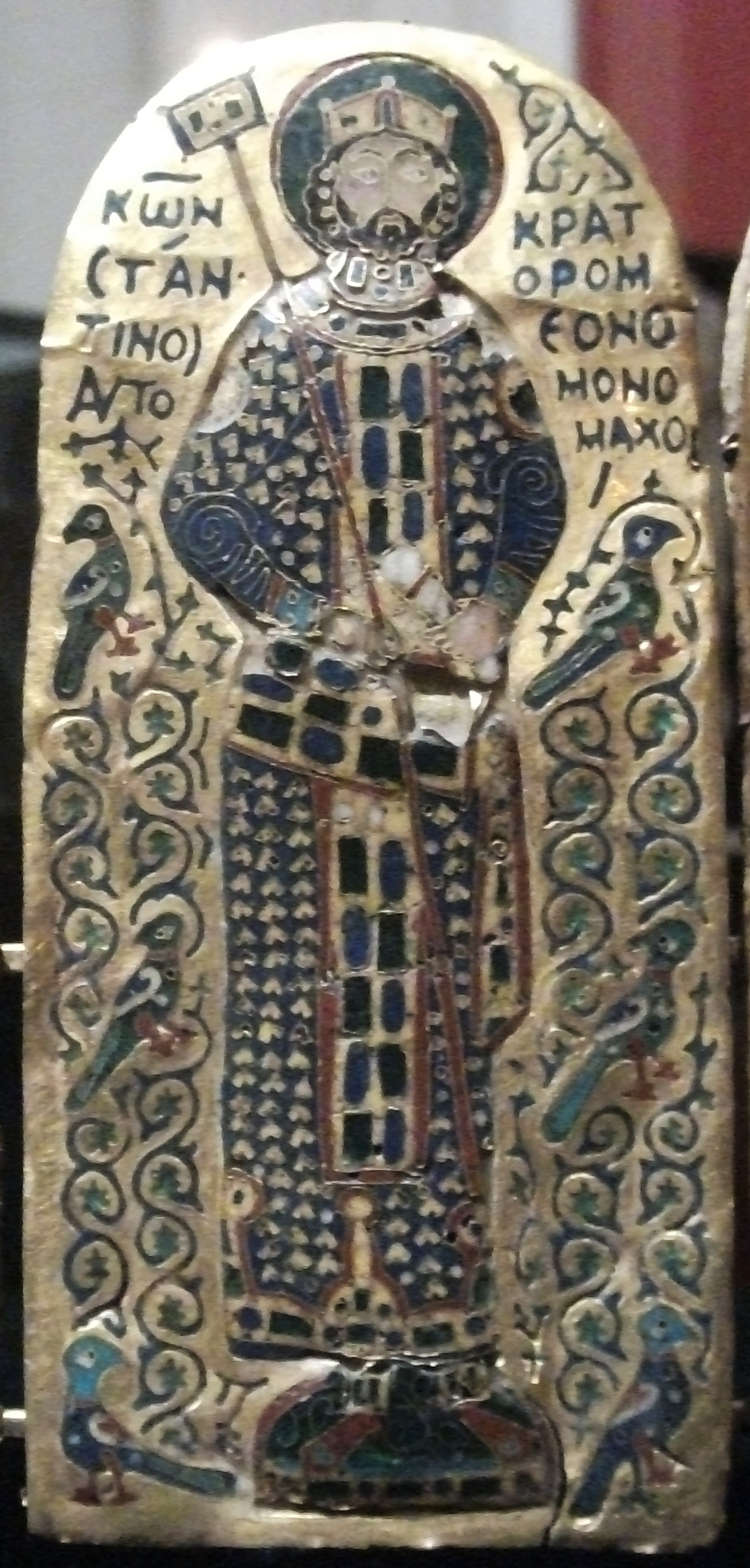
The central panel, depicting Constantine IX Monomachus

In 1860 a farmer near Nyitraivánka discovered the treasure while plowing. The objects passed to a member of the local landowning nobility, who sold them in four transactions to the Hungarian National Museum between 1861 and 1870, the last sale posthumously via a dealer named Markovits. Also sold were the two smaller cloisonné medallions found with the crown plaques, with busts of the apostles Peter and Andrew. These medallions lack holes for nails, unlike the gold plates. In the view of Magda von Bárány-Oberschall and most scholars they almost certainly do not belong to the Monomachus Crown.

The general assumption was for long that the crown "seems almost certainly to be a female crown and was presumably a gift to the wife of a Hungarian king", or to the king himself. In 1045 the Hungarian King Andrew I married Anastasia of Kiev, a daughter of Grand Prince Yaroslav the Wise, whose brother Vsevolod I had been married to Irene (Maria), a daughter of Constantine IX since 1046.

According to the traditional account, Andrew or his queen would have received the crown from Constantine IX at this juncture. He was in need of a new crown, since Henry III had captured the original crown (supposedly donated to king Stephen I by Pope Silvester II in 1000) from King Samuel Aba in 1045 after the Battle of Ménfő and had sent it back to Rome. According to popular legend this was the Holy Crown of Hungary, or some version of it, though it seems unlikely that any elements of the present crown are that old. The fact that Andrew, who had taken power near the end of September 1046, was first able to be crowned in February 1047 could by attributed to the need for a royal embassy to travel from Hungary to Constantinople and back in winter in order to bring the Monomachus crown to Hungary. In 1057 the young King Solomon was also crowned with this crown. Other, very different, possibilities have been suggested and are covered below.

In 1057 Solomon was besieged by Geza I and escaped with the crown and treasure in the direction of Pozsony in order to seek the protection of his brother-in-law Emperor Henry IV. Soldiers of Geza apprehended him as he was fording the Váh near Ivanka pri Nitre. Solomon had the treasure and the crown buried and barricaded himself behind the walls of Pozsony. When Henry IV launched an expedition in September 1074 to restore Solomon to the Hungarian throne, the army of the Emperor abandoned him and rode along the Valley of the Váh in the direction of Nitra and Šintava. Possibly this was a futile attempt to recover the buried crown near the ford of Ivanka pri Nitre.

== Description ==
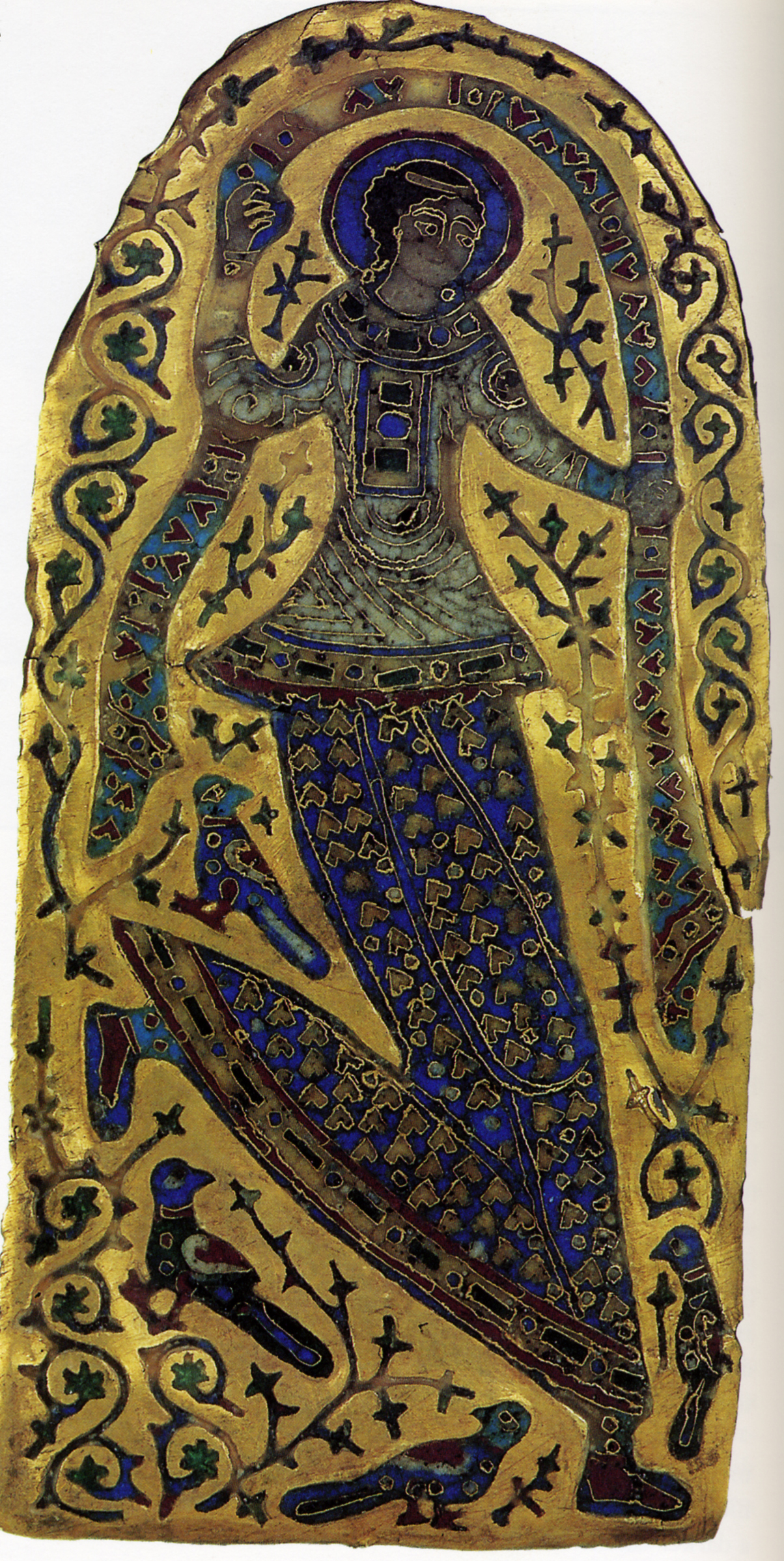
Dancer with veil

The seven gold plates are between 5 and 4.2 cm wide and between 11.5 and 8.7 cm tall. They have asymmetrically cut holes whose size and arrangement suggests that the plates were originally connected by a fabric or leather band. It is possible that remains of golden bands for connecting the plates were found. It is also possible that the seven plates were fastened to a fabric cap. The coarse finish of the decoration, the low purity of the gold plates and the presence of errors in the depiction of the clothing and in the inscriptions are notable.

The central and largest plate shows Emperor Constantine IX Monomachus, who was Byzantine Emperor from 1042 to 1055. A Greek inscription on the panel reads: Κῶνστάντινος Αυτοκράτο[ρ] Ρομεον ο Μονομαχο[ς], Constantine, Emperor of the Romans, the Monomachos. On the plate to the left is his wife, Zoe. On the plate to the right, is Zoe's sister, Theodora. On the smaller panels to the right and left of the Empresses are two dancing female figures. The smallest plates depict the personifications of two Virtues. The figures have halos on their heads and (except for the Virtues) are surrounded by flowering vines, birds and cypresses.

The Emperor is depicted standing, with the labarum in his right hand and in his left the akakia, a fabric pouch which held dust and symbolised the transience of the material world. The Emperor's crown is decorated at its peaks with three balls. The Empresses wear the same crown. They hold a sceptre in their inner hand and point to Emperor Constantine with their outer hand. He wears the ceremonial robes of a Byzantine ruler with ivy decoration and the loros and maniakion, Byzantine symbols of rulership.

The loros is a sash, richly decorated with gemstones, pearls and embroidery which wraps around the shoulders and hips. One end of the loros falls to his hem, the other is tied around it. The maniakion is a broad collar decorated with pearls and gemstones. The three members of the imperial family wear red shoes on their feet and stand atop a suppedion. Both women wear the complete regalia of an Empress with the female version of the loros costume, including the shield-like thorakion hanging diagonally from a belt. Zoe, who was 64 years old in 1042 is depicted in an idealised way as a young woman. Their inscriptions read: "Θέοδώρα ἡ ἐυσαιβεστατι Αυγουστα," Theodora the Most Pious Augusta and "Ζώη οι ευσαιβαῖστάτη Αυγουστα," Zoe the Most Pious Augusta. The Greek of both is full of errors.

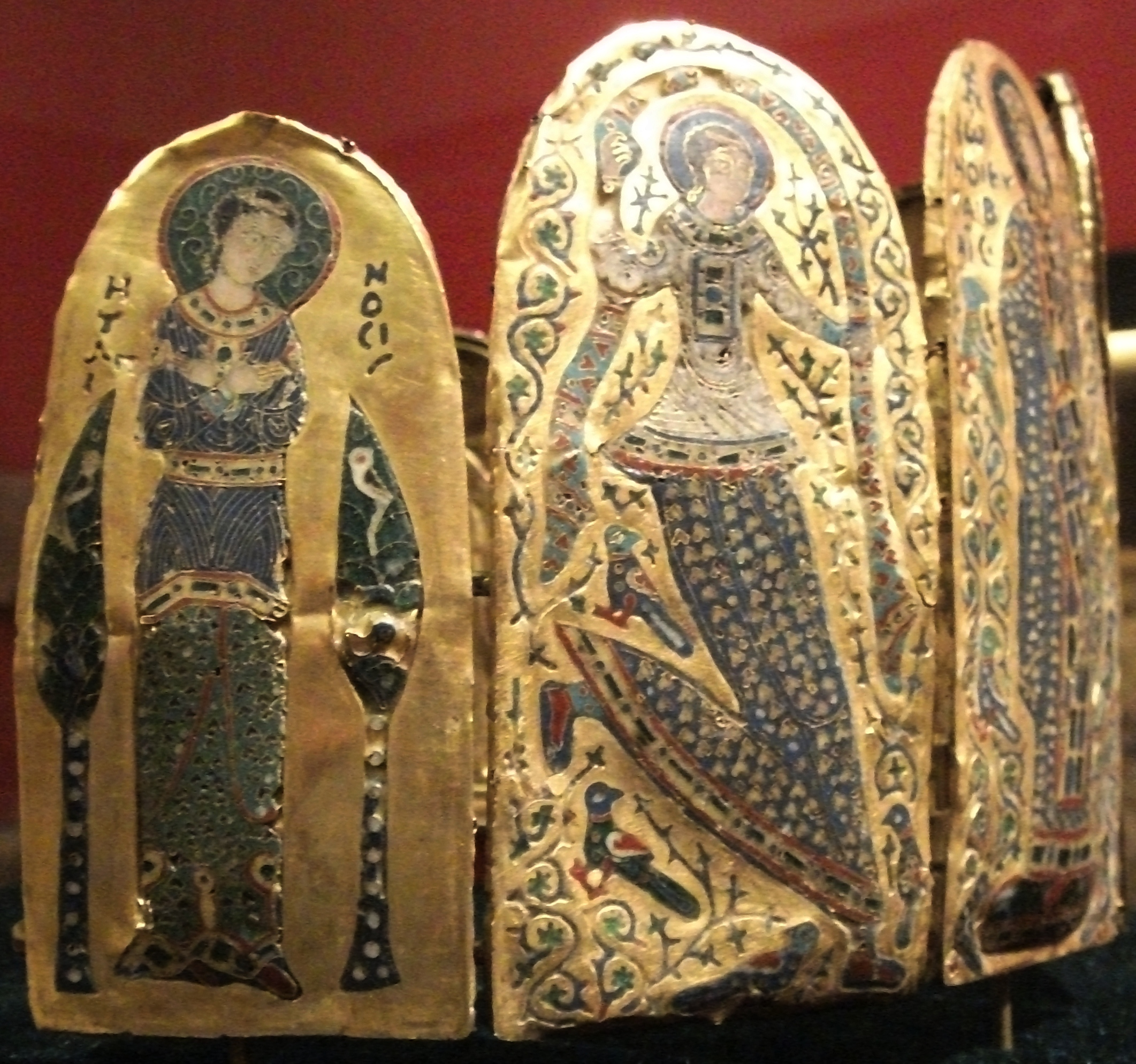
Personification of Humility (left) and Dancer (right)

The two smaller plates depicting dancing women are identical rather than symmetrical. Their backgrounds are also decorated with foliage, but they lack identifying inscriptions. The dancers wave their veils over their heads and bend their right leg sharply backwards. The idea that they are professional dancers may be contradicted by the haloes on their heads, which indicates that they belong to the sacred realm. However, sacred dancing is rare in Christianity, at least before the Renaissance, and the iconography is most unusual in a context to do with public imperial ceremony and coronation, where the Byzantines placed great stress on the emperor as God's agent on earth.

Two even smaller panels each depict a female figure with a halo on a plain golden background, with cypresses on either side of them, symbolising the Garden of Eden. According to their inscriptions they represent the Virtues of "η αλιθηα" (ἡ ἀλήθεια, Sincerity) and "η τα[π]ινοσις" (ἡ ταπείνωσις, Humility). Sincerity holds a cross in one hand and points to her mouth, while Humility crosses her arms over her chest.

John Beckwith saw in the crown a change in style from the enamels of the previous century: "All the figures are visualized in terms of pattern rather than form; the sense of space and depth so typical of the tenth-century enamels has been jettisoned for intricate detail and superficial charm."

== Authenticity and function ==
In 1937 Magda von Bárány-Oberschall investigated the enameled gold plates. The size of the crown formed from the plates led her to argue that it had to be a Byzantine consort's crown from the eleventh century.

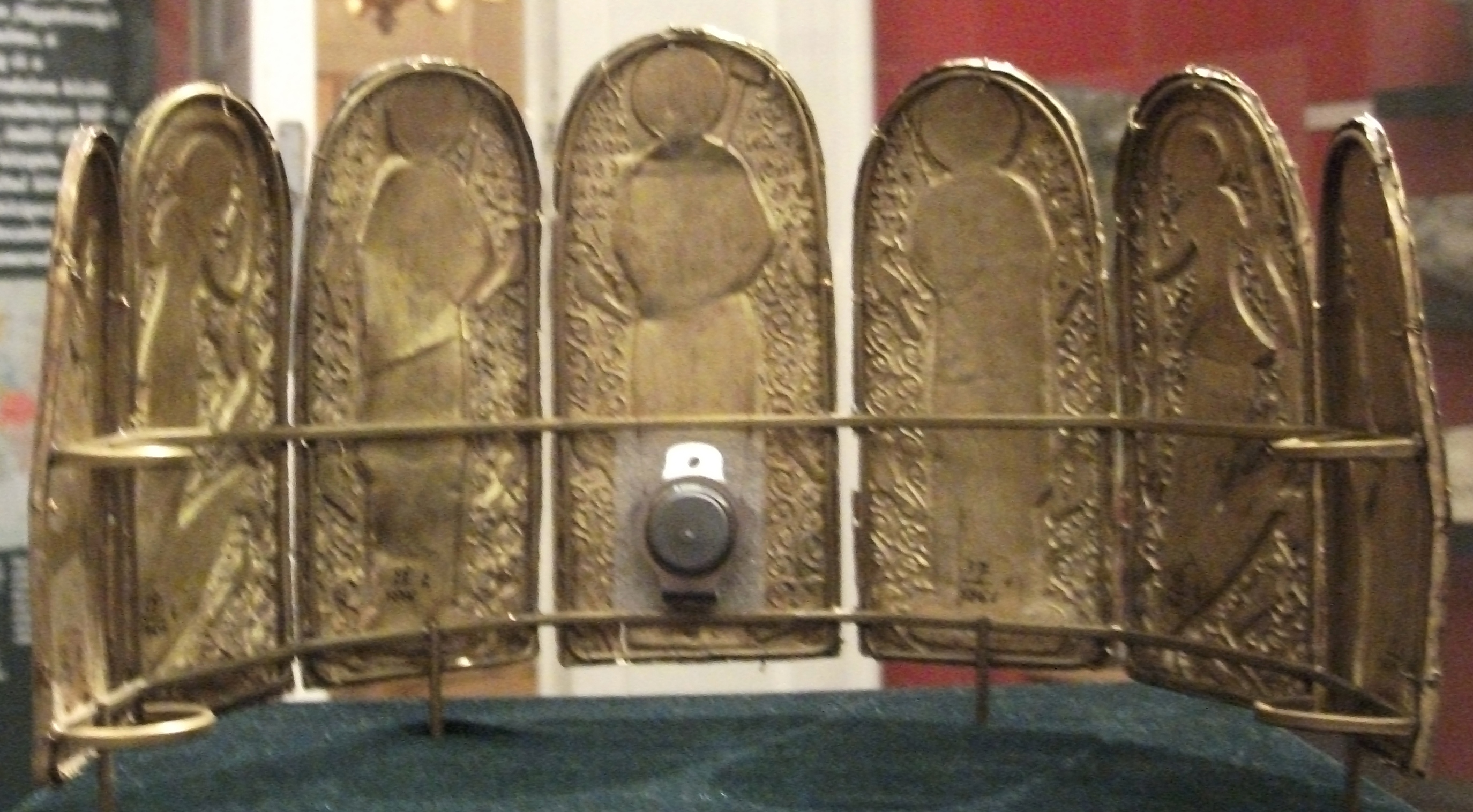
The crown from behind

In 1994, the Greek Byzantinist Nicolas Oikonomidès expressed the view that the Monomachus Crown might be a nineteenth-century forgery. He was led to this opinion by the plain design, coarse finish and the erroneous and unusual captions, when combined with the circumstances of the discovery and plausible models for a forgery. In all these respects the crown contrasts strongly with the Holy Crown of Hungary. He suspected the forger came from Venice, without however being able to put a name to him.

In his article, "The State of Research into the Monomachos Crown and Some Further Thoughts," which addresses Nicolas Oikonomidès' theory in detail and largely argues against it, Etele Kiss of the Hungarian National Museum mentioned that the crown could have been made for the emperor, to be presented in a triumphal procession, thus explaining the presence of the dancers, one area of debate..

Already in 1997, Henry Maguire had argued that the plaques were intended to be sewn to a leather or cloth backing, and suggested a belt, for which there are some sources, or diadem. He related the dancers to a "chorus of graces" supposed, at least in Byzantine rhetoric, to form a ring around the emperor, dancing and singing his praises. The motifs of birds and plants are metaphors for the virtues of the emperor.

In 2009 Timothy Dawson elaborated on these arguments, proposing that the crown was actually a ceremonial armband, a grand version of an armilla given to soldiers as an award. The De Ceremoniis of Constantine VII Porphyrogennetos written a century earlier describes how the emperor was presented with a crown on returning after a victory, which he then wore on his right arm. Dawson suggested that the most likely recipients in Constantine IX's reign were Stephanos Pergamenos, a court eunuch who was a surprising success as a general, for his victory over George Maniakes at the Battle of Ostrobos on 2 February 1043, or the emperor himself on the same occasion. Michael Psellos records that the emperor sat between the two empresses to view the procession, which the placement of the plaques may reflect. The armill is a medieval variation, more often part of coronation regalia, which may also be relevant.

The triumph of Stephanos Pergamenos was approved by the Emperor at the last moment and Dawson argued that rushed production could explain the coarse finish and spelling errors; if it was given to Pergamenos, the lower quality and relative plainness of the piece are explicable. The same would apply to the depiction of the emperor, odd on a piece he would wear himself, as is the depiction of a figure representing Humility. If it belonged to the emperor, or came to do so when Pergamenos' possessions were later confiscated, then after the celebrations it would have been stored in the Imperial treasure chamber and then later sent to Hungary as a diplomatic gift. Alternatively it may have escaped Byzantium in the wake of the downfall of Pergamenos. Another possibility is that it is simply loot from the Crusaders' sack of Constantinople in 1204, or the period of Latin rule thereafter. All these are speculative accounts.

== Gallery ==
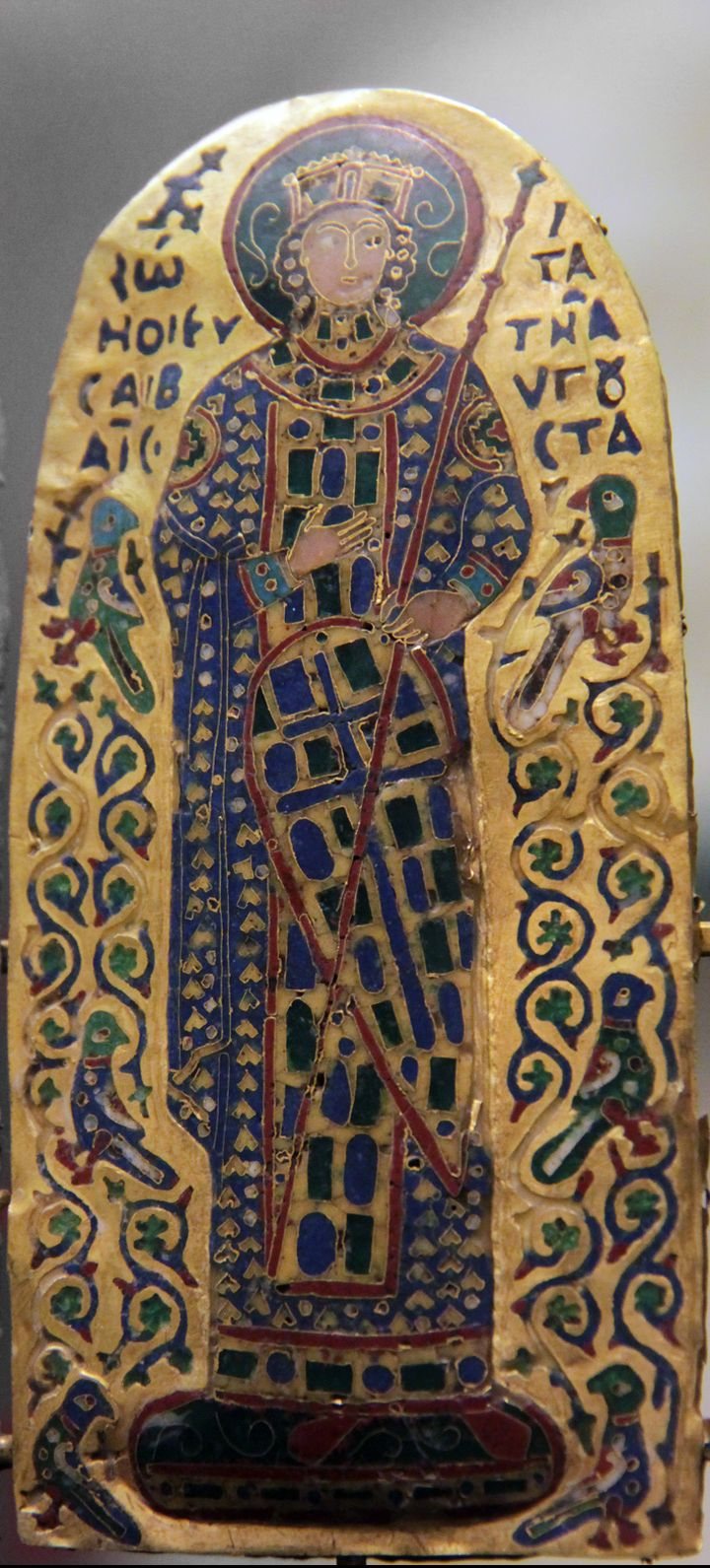
Empress Zoe

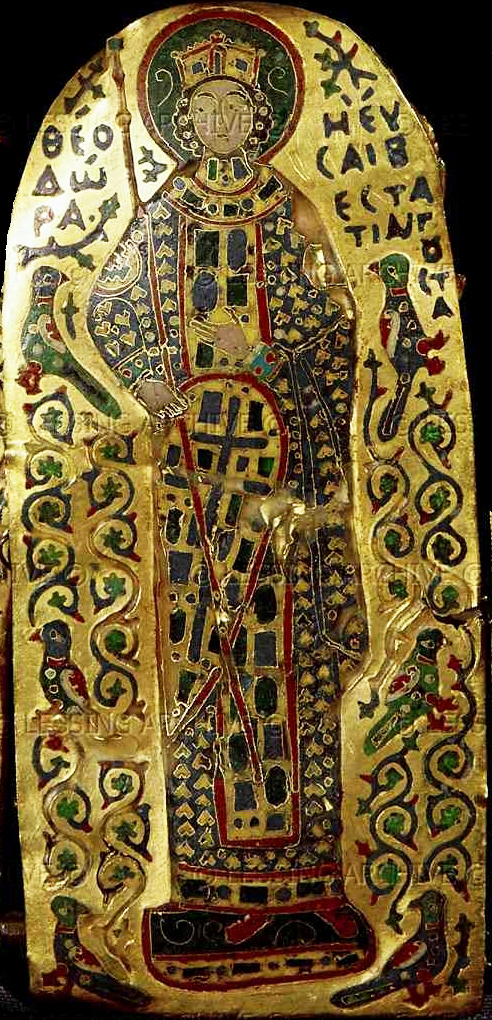
Theodora,

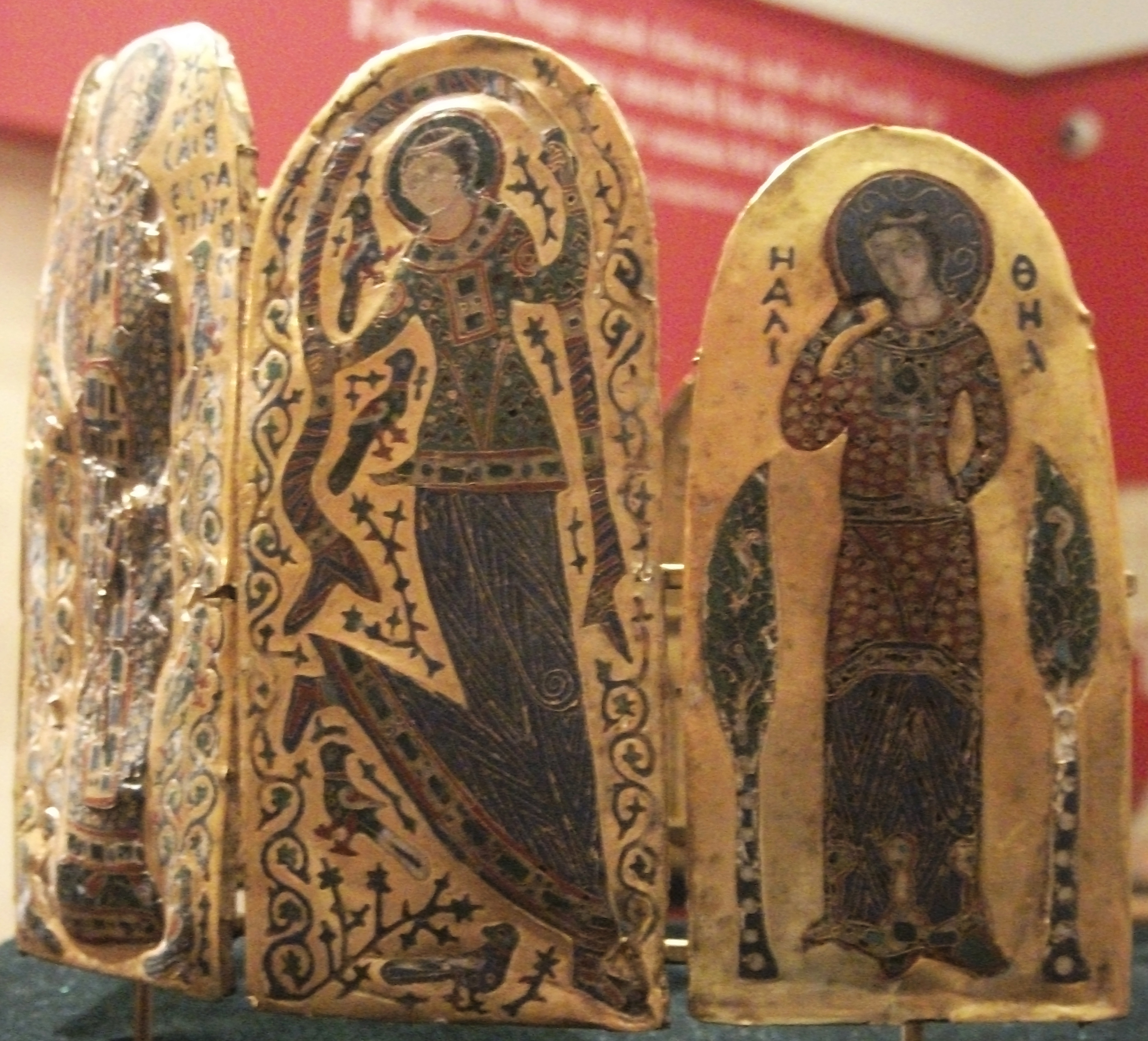
Dancer and ἡ ἀλήθεια, Sincerity

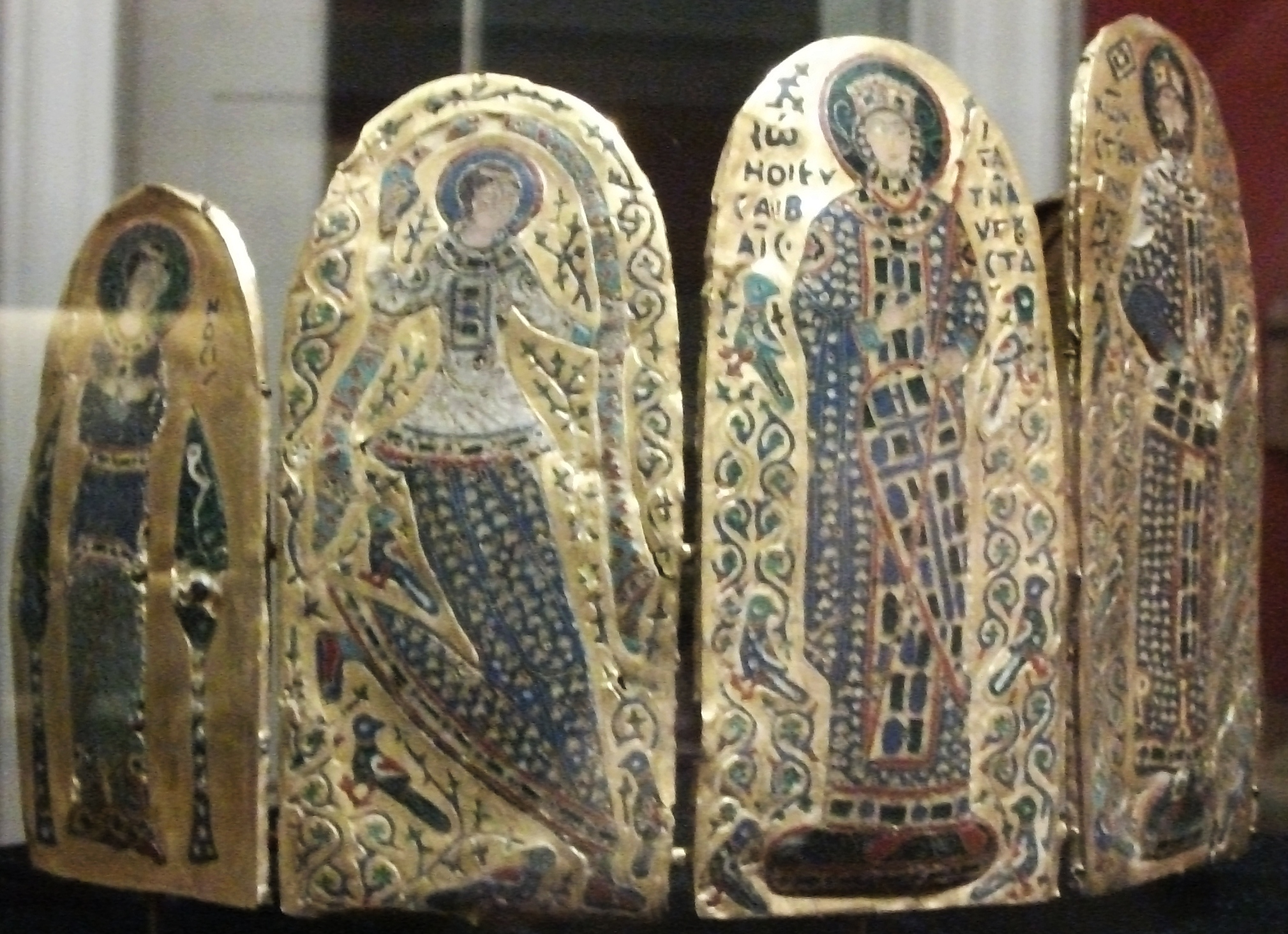
Another view

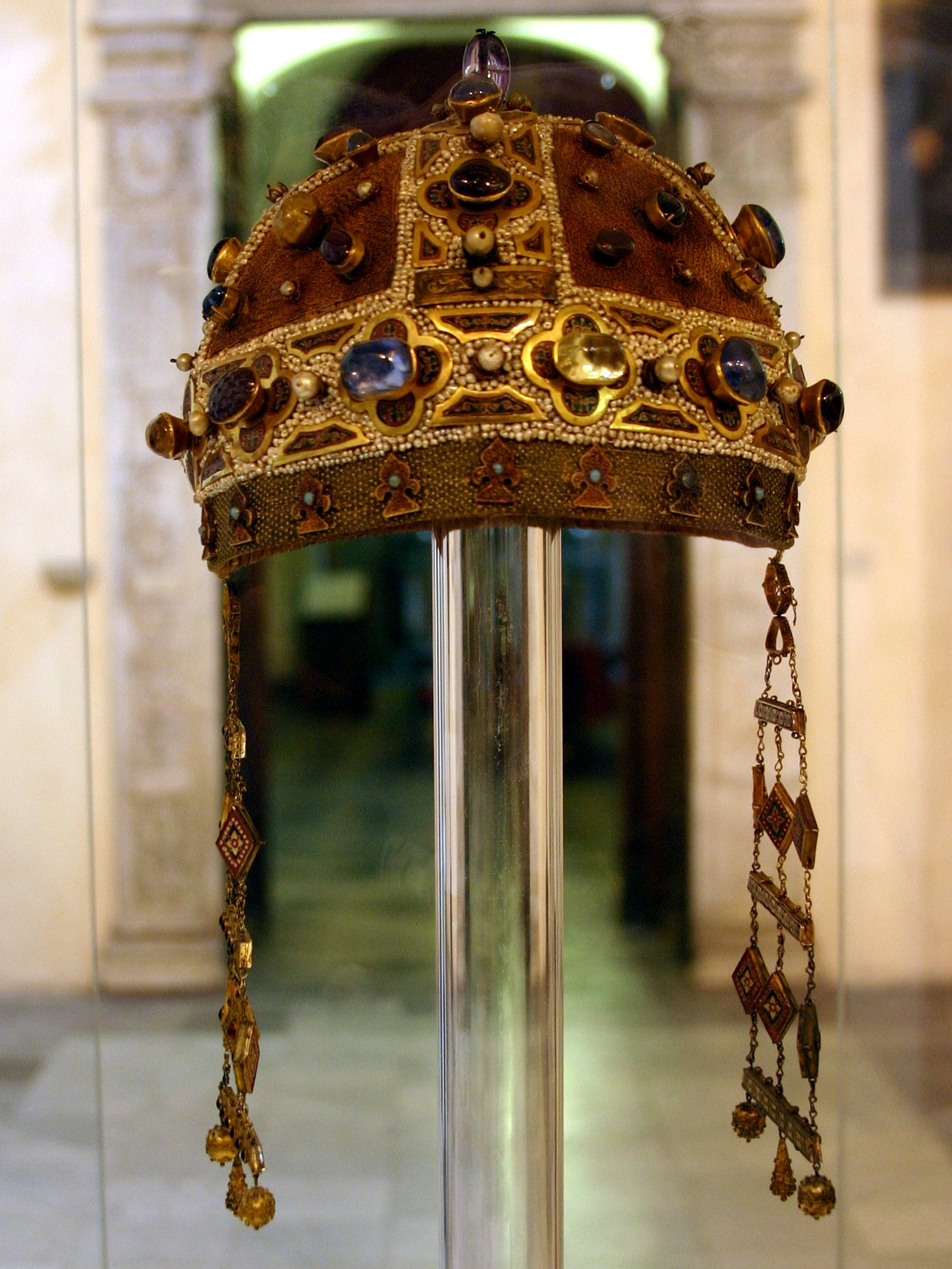
Empress Constance of Aragon's Byzantine crown, 12th century
