= Basil Lekapenos =

Illegitimate child of Romanos I

Proedros of the Senate
- Parakoimomenos; 963 – 985
- Monarchs: Basil II; John I Tzimiskes; Nikephoros II Phokas
- Preceded by: Joseph Bringas

Patrikios
- Parakoimomenos; 947/8 – 959
- Monarch: Constantine VII
- Preceded by: Theophanes
- Succeeded by: Joseph Bringas

Protospatharios(?)
- Protovestiarios c. 940 – 945
- Monarchs: Constantine VII; Romanos I Lekapenos

Personal details
- Born: c. 925
- Died: c. 985
- Parent: Romanos I Lekapenos

Basil Lekapenos (Greek: Βασίλειος Λεκαπηνός, romanized: Basíleios Lekapēnós; c. 925 – c. 985), also called the Parakoimomenos (ὁ παρακοιμώμενος) or the Nothos (ὁ Νόθος, "the Bastard"), was an illegitimate child of the Byzantine emperor Romanos I Lekapenos. He served as the grand chamberlain and chief minister of the Byzantine Empire for most of the period 947 to 985, under emperors Constantine VII (his brother-in-law), Romanos II (his nephew), Nikephoros II Phokas, John I Tzimiskes, and Basil II (his great nephew).

== Biography ==
=== Origin and early career ===
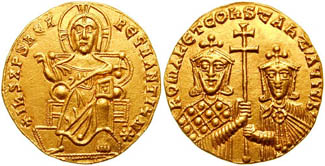
Gold solidus of Basil's father, Romanos I Lekapenos, with Basil's brother-in-law, Constantine VII

Basil was the illegitimate son of the emperor Romanos I Lekapenos (ruled 920–944) by a concubine. It is reported that his mother was a slave woman of "Scythian" (possibly implying Slavic) origin, but according to Kathryn Ringrose "this may just be a pejorative topos". The exact date of his birth is unknown; the Oxford Dictionary of Byzantium suggests ca. 925, while the Dutch scholar W. G. Brokaar suggested sometime between 910 and 915. Later Byzantine chroniclers like John Skylitzes, Zonaras, and Kedrenos, claim that Basil was castrated as an adult, following the deposition of his father in 944; Michael Psellos however reports that this was done for political reasons during his infancy, a view supported by modern scholars like Brokaar and Ringrose, since castration of adults was considered dangerous and was rather rare.

His role during the reign of his father is unknown. He first appears as the protovestiarios (chamberlain) of Constantine VII Porphyrogennetos (r. 913–959), the legitimate emperor of the Macedonian dynasty, but it is unclear whether it was Romanos Lekapenos who appointed him to the post or whether Constantine VII gave it to him after Romanos' downfall. The contemporary Theophanes Continuatus reports that Basil was a loyal and dedicated servant of Constantine VII, and had a close relationship with Constantine's wife, and his own half-sister, Helena Lekapene. Following the deposition of Romanos Lekapenos in December 944, Basil supported Constantine VII when he regained power from Basil's half-brothers Stephen Lekapenos and Constantine Lekapenos in January 945, and was rewarded with senior titles and offices: in his seals and dedicatory inscriptions he is called a basilikos, patrikios, "paradynasteuon of the Senate" (likely a distortion indicating the combined titles of paradynasteuon and protos, "first", of the Senate), as well as megas baioulos (grand preceptor) of Constantine's son and heir, the future Romanos II (r. 959–963). In c. 947/8 he was raised further from protovestiarios to parakoimomenos (head chamberlain), in succession to Theophanes.

In 958, he led troops to the East to reinforce the general (and future emperor) John Tzimiskes in his campaign against the Arabs: the Byzantines stormed Samosata and inflicted a heavy defeat on a relief army under the Hamdanid emir of Aleppo, Sayf al-Dawla. The Byzantines made many prisoners, including relatives of the Hamdanid emir. As a result, Basil was allowed to celebrate a triumph in the Hippodrome of Constantinople, where the captives were paraded before the populace of the Byzantine capital. Basil was an opponent of the Patriarch Polyeuctus (956–970) and sought, with some success, to turn the emperor against him. According to the sources, this was because the patriarch castigated the avarice of the Lekapenoi and their relatives. He was at Constantine VII's side during his final days, and was the one who wrapped his corpse with its burial shroud.

=== Career under Romanos II, Nikephoros Phokas, and John Tzimiskes ===
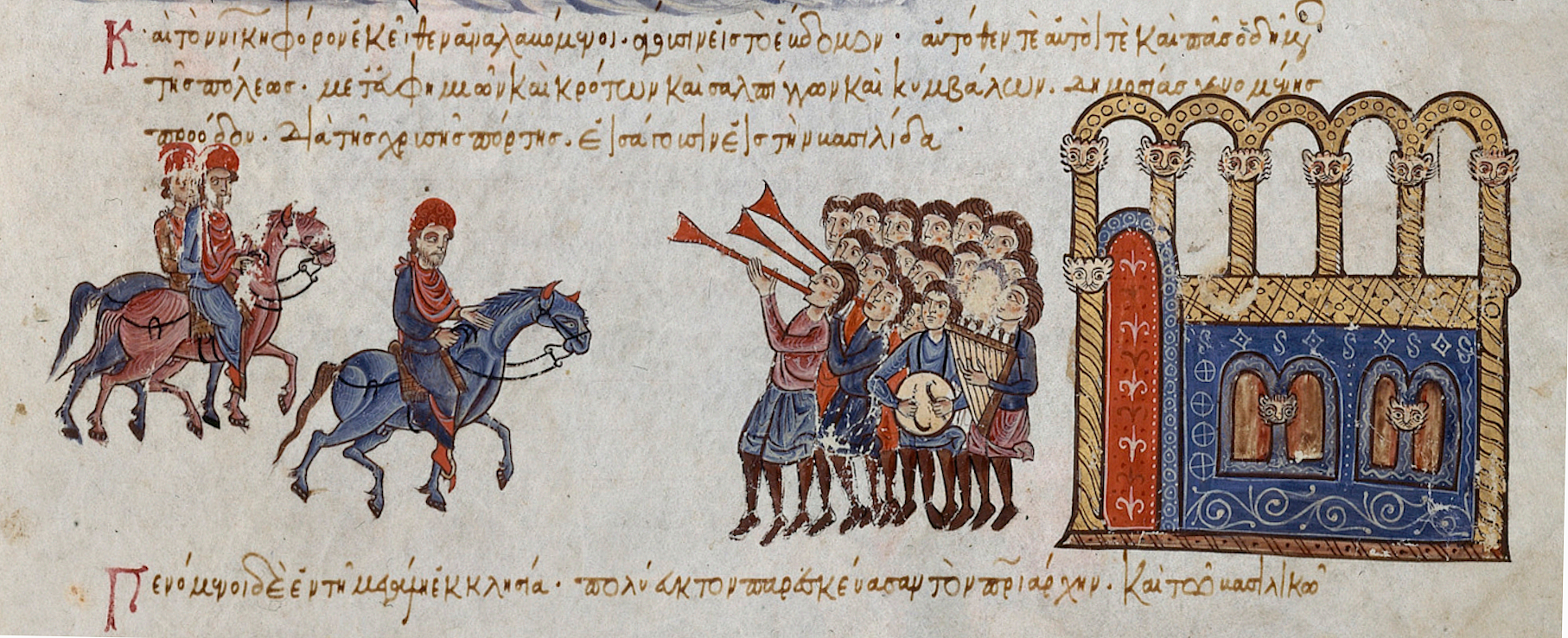
Nikephoros Phokas' entry into Constantinople as Emperor in 963, from the Madrid Skylitzes

Upon his accession, Romanos II dismissed him and favoured another official, Joseph Bringas, who assumed Basil's positions of paradynasteuon, protos, and parakoimomenos. This began a fierce rivalry and even hatred between the two men. Basil remained on the sidelines for the duration of the reign, but when Romanos died in early 963, his sons Basil II and Constantine VIII were underage, and a struggle for the throne erupted. Basil sided with the distinguished general Nikephoros Phokas against Bringas. Basil armed his numerous attendants—some 3,000 according to the sources—and with the urban mob attacked Bringas and his supporters and seized control of the city and the ports. Bringas sought sanctuary in the Hagia Sophia, while Basil mobilized the imperial dromon and other vessels to Chrysopolis, where Phokas awaited with his army. Phokas entered the city, and was crowned senior emperor as guardian of Romanos II's young sons. As a reward for his role in Phokas' elevation to the throne, Basil was restored to his old post as parakoimomenos and received the new exalted rank of proedros (fully proedros tes Synkletou, "president of the Senate"). The elevation to this office involved a special ceremony, included in the De ceremoniis, and possibly written or edited by Basil himself.

It is unclear what role Basil played under Phokas. The report of Liutprand of Cremona during his visit in 968 shows him among the senior dignitaries of the Byzantine court, but the second man of the regime was clearly Nikephoros' younger brother, the kouropalates and logothetes tou dromou Leo Phokas the Younger. Although he did not take part in the assassination of Phokas by Tzimiskes in December 969 by feigning illness (and then becoming ill in reality), he knew of it and threw his full support behind Tzimiskes' assumption of the throne afterward, sending his agents to the city to warn the populace against fomenting unrest or engaging in plunder. According to the contemporary historian Leo the Deacon, Basil was a close friend of Tzimiskes, but it may also be that Basil's support for this coup was an effort to safeguard the position and rights of his nephews Basil II and Constantine VIII, as a continuation of the Phokas regime would likely have seen Leo Phokas succeed his brother.

Basil helped the new emperor get rid of Phokas' supporters and relatives. He also assisted in the retirement of Romanos II's and Phokas' widow, Theophano, and advised Tzimiskes to cement his position by marrying Theodora, a daughter of Constantine VII. Under Tzimiskes, Basil played a leading role in the governance of the state, especially in the fiscal administration, while Tzimiskes himself was more concerned with foreign policy and his military campaigns. Basil himself took part in the great campaign against the Rus' in Bulgaria in 971, having been entrusted with the reserve forces, the baggage train and the supply arrangements, while Tzimiskes himself with his elite troops marched ahead.

During this period, Basil amassed a huge fortune, including entire settlements in the recently conquered southeastern portions of Anatolia. Leo the Deacon mentions the localities of Longias and Drize, while Skylitzes reports that he owned the region between Anazarbos and Podandos. These riches were the cause of Basil's break with Tzimiskes; the sources report that on his return from campaign in Syria in 974, the Emperor saw the vast estates belonging to Basil, and resolved to move against him. Learning of this, Basil arranged for Tzimiskes to be poisoned, although the sources differ on how and where this was done. Modern scholars are skeptical towards these reports; as Kathryn Ringrose writes, "contemporaries believed that eunuchs, like women, rarely fought men honorably and instead resorted to poison and to other underhanded tricks", while the Oxford Dictionary of Byzantium speaks of "rumours that [Tzimiskes] had been poisoned by Basil the Nothos". All that is certain is that Tzimiskes fell ill during his campaign and died in Constantinople shortly after his return.

=== Career under Basil II ===
He continued in office in the early reign of Basil II but in 985 the young Emperor—wishing to assume the government himself after being dominated by regents and caretaker emperors for thirty years—accused him of sympathizing with the rebel Bardas Phokas and removed Basil from power. All his lands and possessions were confiscated and all laws issued under his administration were declared null and void. Basil Lekapenos himself was exiled and died shortly afterwards.

== Patronage of the arts ==
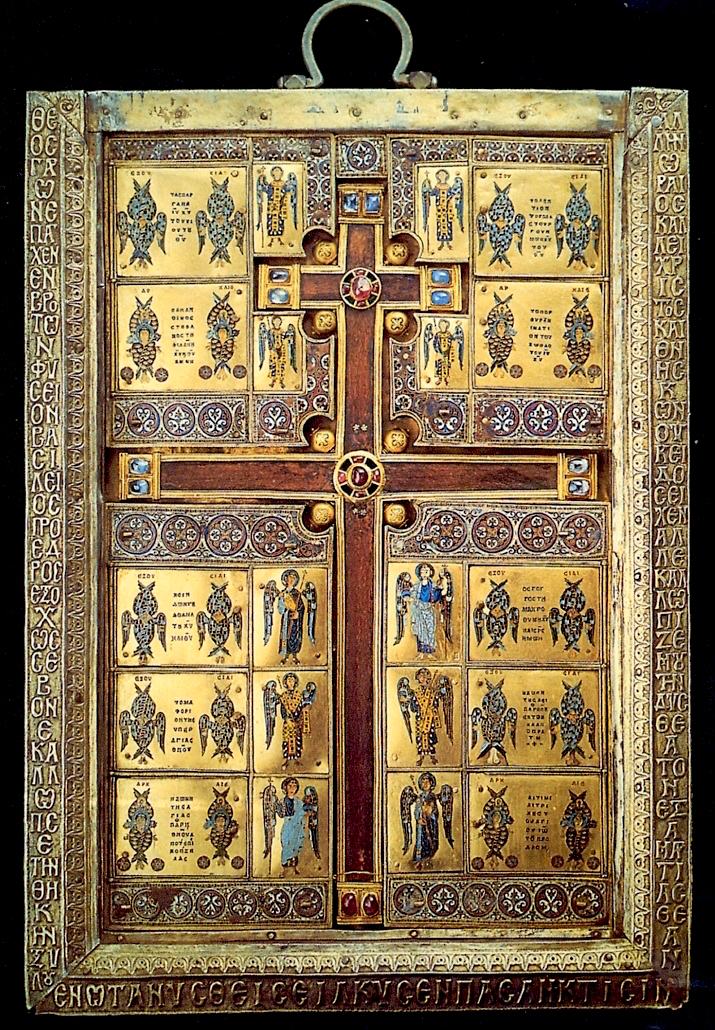
The cross-reliquary of Limburg, commissioned by Basil

His enormous wealth enabled Basil to become, according to the Oxford Dictionary of Byzantium, "one of the most lavish Byzantine art patrons". Several of the objets d'art he commissioned have survived, including a reliquary of the head of Saint Symeon the Stylite at Camaldoli in Italy, a yellow jasper paten and a chalice at St. Mark's Basilica in Venice, and a well-known enamelled cross reliquary (staurotheke) at Limburg Cathedral in Germany. Another reliquary containing the head of Stephen the Protomartyr was held at a Franciscan monastery in Heraklion, and was described in 1628 by the missionary Alexander Basilopoulos. According to Vitalien Laurent, these items share similar characteristics in their rich and high-quality decoration, and the relatively lengthy verse dedicatory inscriptions that accompany them. They were probably all dedications to the Monastery of Saint Basil in Constantinople, whose treasures were later pillaged by Basil II. Three manuscripts commissioned by him also survive, all written in high-quality parchment: a collection of Taktika, including his own treatise on naval warfare, now in the Biblioteca Ambrosiana in Milan; the homilies of John Chrysostom, in the Dionysiou Monastery of Mount Athos, Greece; and a Gospel with the Pauline epistles preceded by a fine book epigram dedicated to Basil now in Saint Petersburg. He is also the likely patron of the Joshua Roll (BAV, Pal. Gr. 431) an illuminated scroll of the Old Testament book of Joshua.

== Sources ==
- Brokaar, W.G. (1972). "Basil Lecapenus". Studia bizantina et neohellenica Neerlandica. 3: 199–234.
- Holmes, Catherine (2005). Basil II and the Governance of Empire (976–1025). Oxford, United Kingdom: Oxford University Press. ISBN 978-0-19-927968-5.
- Kazhdan, Alexander, ed. (1991). The Oxford Dictionary of Byzantium. New York and Oxford: Oxford University Press. ISBN 978-0-19-504652-6.
- Laurent, V. (1953). "Ὁ μέγας βαΐουλος. À l'occasion du parakimomène Basile Lékapène". Επετηρίς Εταιρείας Βυζαντινών Σπουδών (in French). XXIII: 193–205. hdl:11615/16013.
- Lilie, Ralph-Johannes; Ludwig, Claudia; Pratsch, Thomas; Zielke, Beate (2013). Prosopographie der mittelbyzantinischen Zeit Online. Berlin-Brandenburgische Akademie der Wissenschaften. Nach Vorarbeiten F. Winkelmanns erstellt (in German). Berlin and Boston: De Gruyter.
- Ringrose, Kathryn M. (2003). The Perfect Servant: Eunuchs and the Social Construction of Gender in Byzantium. Chicago and London: University of Chicago Press. ISBN 978-0-226-72015-9.
- Treadgold, Warren (1997). A History of the Byzantine State and Society. Stanford, California: Stanford University Press. ISBN 0-8047-2630-2.
- Vlysidou, Vassiliki (2005). Η πολιτική του Βασιλείου Λακαπηνού έναντι της Δύσης. Byzantine Symmeikta (in Greek) (17): 111–129. ISSN 1105-1639. Archived from the original on 2016-01-31.
- Wander, Steven H. (2012). The Joshua Roll. Wiesbaden: Dr. Ludwig Reichert Verlag. ISBN 978-3-89500-854-2.

Court offices
Preceded by Theophanes	Parakoimomenos of the Byzantine emperor 947–959	Succeeded by Joseph Bringas
Preceded by Joseph Bringas	Parakoimomenos of the Byzantine emperor 963–985	Unknown Title next held by Nicholas
