= Fieschi Morgan Staurotheke =

Enamels-cloisonné highlighted in The MET collection

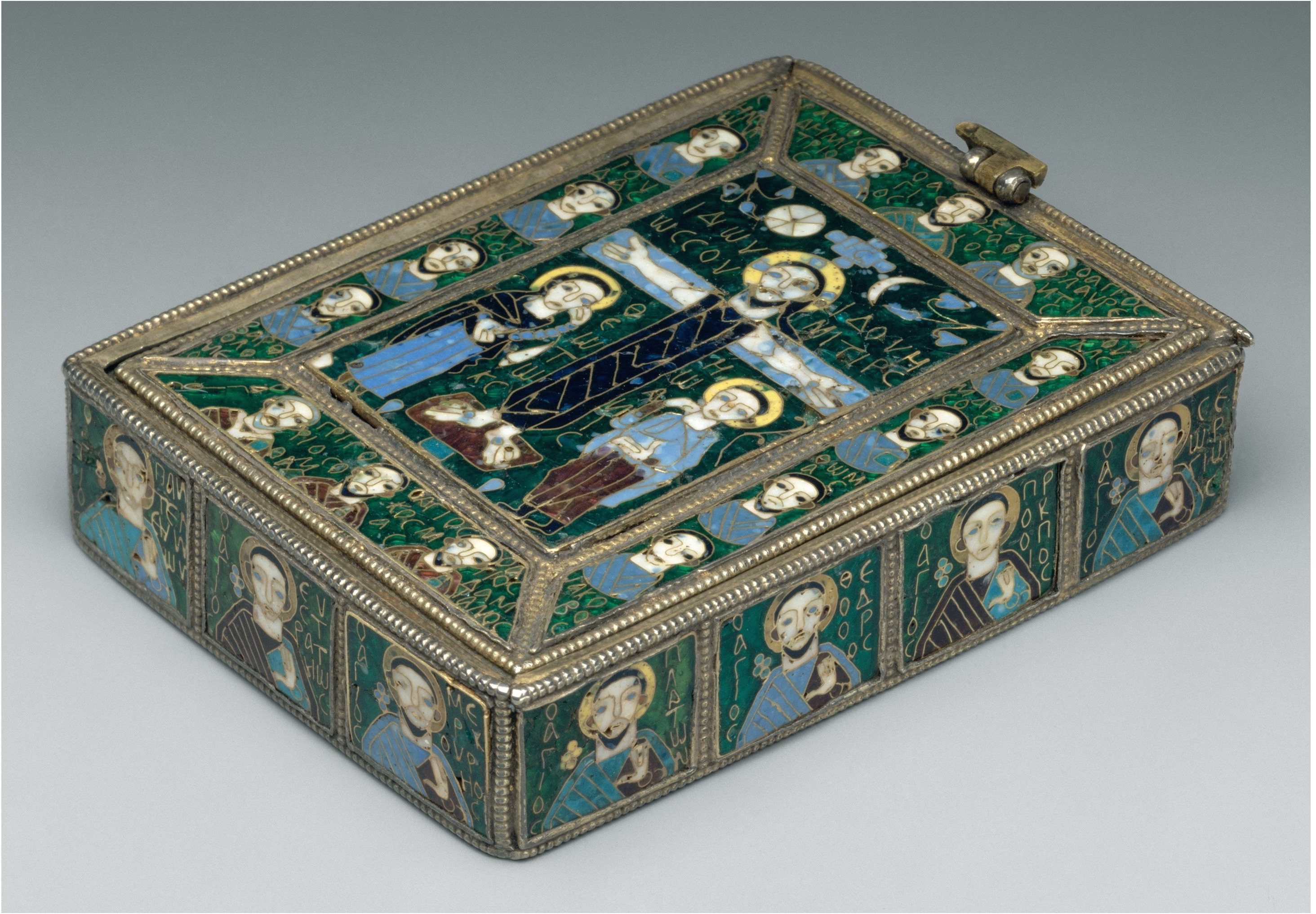
Fieschi Morgan Staurothèque - early 9th century

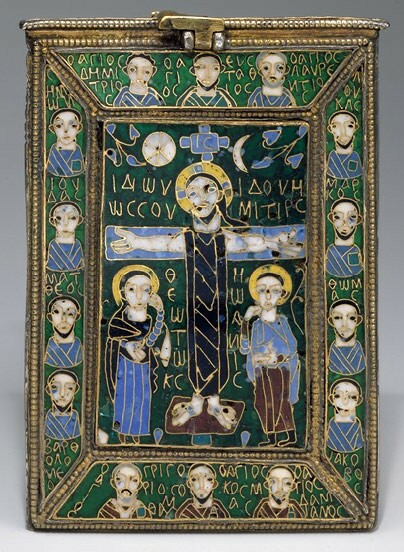
Fieschi Morgan Staurothèque - early 9th century

The Fieschi Morgan Staurotheke is a small reliquary designed to hold a relic of the true cross, it is 1 1/16 x 4 1/16 x 2 13/16 inches (2.7 x 10.3 x 7.1 cm) overall with lid. It is an example of Byzantine enameling. The box is dated to 843 (some scholars speculate an earlier date of 815). Both dates hover around the second wave of Byzantine Iconoclasm from 814 to 842, allowing this piece to become a lens into the post iconoclastic art. These reliquaries doubled as an icon in style and purpose. The physical material of icons and the content within the reliquary were believed to contained a spirit or energy. It was believed that reliquaries contained great power, thus explains its preservation throughout the years. There are numerous theories of where this piece was created and its movement. It's currently on display at the Metropolitan Museum.

== Physical description ==
The staurotheke is made from gilded silver, gold, enamel worked in cloisonné, and niello. The front lid depicts Christ on the cross wearing a colobium (sleeveless tunic) flanked by Mary and Saint John the Theologian. On either side of Christ head there is a sun and moon and Greek text which says "Here is your son...Here is your Mother" and each figure is called out by name; Mother of God, Jesus, and John. Christ eyes are open and appears to be alive which is an important dating factor, as 9th century crucifixion scenes often detailed Christ's eyes closed, a crown of thorns, bleeding hands and feet, and the skull of Adam. Bordering the Crucifixion scene are 14 saints who are depicted subtly different from one another, starting from the top left going counter clockwise they are: Saint Demetrios, Saint Eustathios, Saint Lawrence, Luke, Mark, Thomas, James, Saint Damiano, Saint Kosmas, Saint Gregory the Miracle-Worker, Bartholomew, Matthew, Jude, and Simon.

Underneath the lid the surface is divided into four parts and created using niello, the top left, the Annunciation; top right, the Nativity and bathing of Jesus; bottom left, the Crucifixion (which mimics the front lid); and the bottom right, the Anastasis (Christ descent into Hell) scene pulling Adam and Eve out of Hell. Greek text within the scenes translates to, "Hail, full of grace!" and "Here is your son...Here is your mother." The lid was only removed by intimate viewers, so these scenes might have been more privileged. The interior of the box is divided by a Patriarchal (double cross) walls which create 5 sections. It is believed to have contained a wooden cross relic that would have fit perfectly within the main section, the 4 surrounding compartments would have contained other Holy relics, such as bones, hair, cloth, etc.

Along the sides of the box are 13 saints with halos and a golden latch; Saint Anastasios, Saint Nicholas, Saint Platon, Saint Theodore, Saint Prokopios, Saint George, Saint Merkourios, Saint Eustratios, Saint Panteleimon, Saint Andrew, Saint John, Saint Paul, Saint Peter. The saints along the sides are represented with great variance, despite the approximately one square inch space, making distinguishes between color of eyes, hair style, and facial hair. The base of the container is gold stamped with a dot pattern into a shape of a Latin cross, with circular or disc shaped ends.

Overall, the box is small in size and packs in many narratives and figures. Its cloisonne is considered crude and lettering is botched for Byzantine standards. Other scholars have called it naive and stiff compared to other cloisonné and enamel pieces of that period. The primary colors of the reliquary enamel are emerald green, blue, maroon, gold, and white.

== Creation and movement ==
Artisans were persecuted, like the story of Lazarus whose hands were burnt after defying to destroy and renounce his craft. The Fieschi Morgan Staurotheke is an object that offers one perspective of art created after the decline in religious crafts. The trade of skilled artisans needed to be outsourced beyond the Byzantine empire and outside the purge of figurative art. Rome continued to create and explore art techniques and played a role reeducating Byzantine artists. Rome is a source for enamel art as the colors used in the Fieschi Morgan Staurotheke were in production there and the city was a place of refuge for iconophiles. It is most popularly believed that this was created in the shadows from iconoclasm or just after iconoclasm in Constantinople.

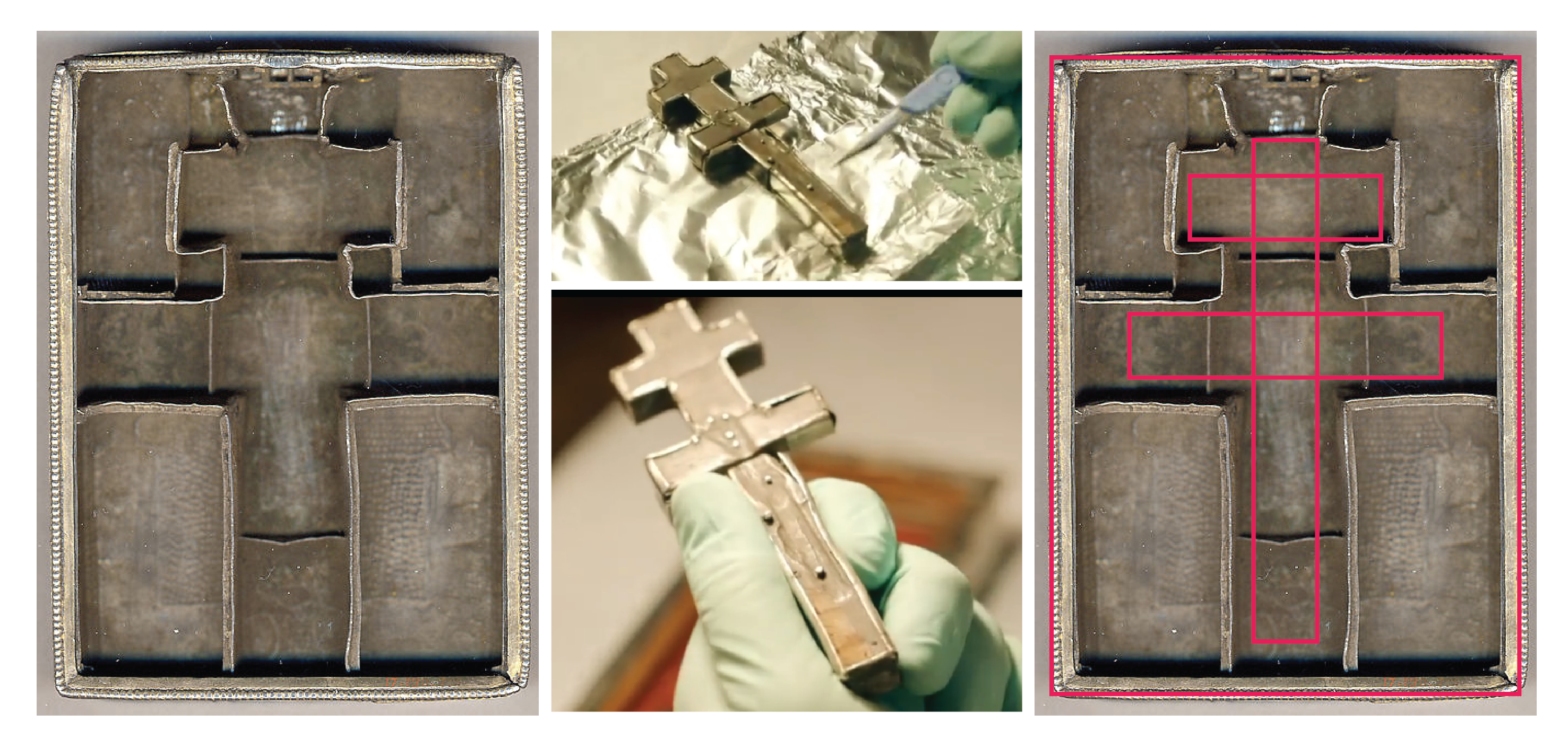
Reliquary and True Cross Dimensions

The reliquary could have arrived in Italy by the Crusaders in 1204, as many precious art pieces entered western Europe. It was also common that monks traveling west would give gifts to the monasteries. A theory of the relic being separated from the reliquary was due to its poor craftsmanship or creation by an immature student and was not worthy to house the true cross relic. The relic was taken out and worn on a necklace by Pope Innocent IV. Pope Innocent IV presented the relic to his new basilica, San Salvatore di Lavagna, in 1245 (where it still resides) and the box became an heirloom of the Fieschi Family. The relic and reliquary have never been put together. Based on the dimensions presented of the reliquary and cross relic here is a diagram that shows that the relic could fit within the reliquary.

Another theory is that the reliquary was never brought to the west but was created in the west. Evidence of enamel coloring and the art practice being revived in Rome supports this theory. In addition, Saint Lawrence, depicted on the reliquary was a popular saint in the west beginning in the 5th century but not in the east until the 10th century.

In April 1887 the box was purchased at an auction by Freiherr Albert Von Oppenheim. In 1906 it was purchased by J. Pierpont Morgan in London and given to the Met Museum in 1913.
