= Ivanka pri Nitre =

Village and municipality in Slovakia

Ivanka pri Nitre Nyitraivánka
- Municipality
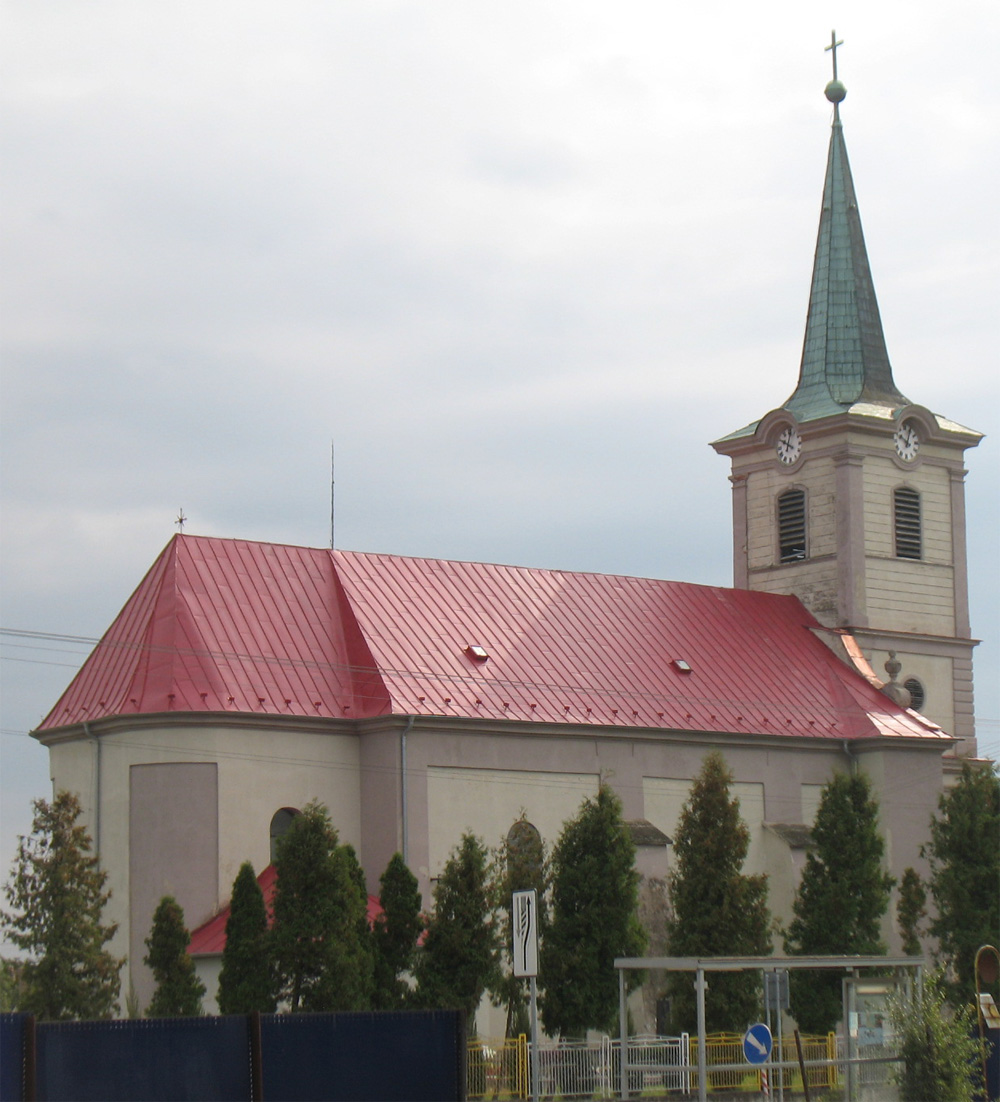

- Flag

- Location of Ivanka pri Nitre in the Nitra Region Location of Ivanka pri Nitre in Slovakia
- Coordinates: 48.24°N 18.12°E
- Country: Slovakia
- Region: Nitra Region
- District: Nitra District
- First mentioned: 1400

Area
  - Total: 14.90 km^{2} (5.75 sq mi)
- Elevation: 140 m (460 ft)

Population (2025)
  - Total: 3,102
- Time zone: UTC+1 (CET)
  - Summer (DST): UTC+2 (CEST)
- Postal code: 951 12
- Area code: +421 37
- Vehicle registration plate (until 2022): NR
- Website: ivankaprinitre.sk/web/

Ivanka pri Nitre (Hungarian: Nyitraivánka) is a village and municipality in the Nitra District in western central Slovakia, in the Nitra Region.

== History ==
In historical records the village was first mentioned in 1400. The Byzantine Monomachus crown was unearthed there in 1860 by a farmer ploughing in what was then Nyitraivánka in the Kingdom of Hungary.

== Geography ==
The municipality lies at an altitude of 140 metres (460 ft) and covers an area of 14.90 km^{2} (5.75 sq mi) (2025).

== Population ==
Population statistic (10 years)
Year	1995	2005	2015	2025
Count	2241	2445	2492	3102
Difference		+9.10%	+1.92%	+24.47%

Population statistic
Year	2024	2025
Count	3083	3102
Difference		+0.61%

It has a population of 3102 people (31 December 2025).

=== Ethnicity ===
Census 2021 (1+ %)
Ethnicity	Number	Fraction
Slovak	2643	92.15%
Not found out	201	7%
Total	2868	

In year 2021 was 2868 people by ethnicity 2643 as Slovak, 201 as Not found out, 23 as Hungarian, 22 as Czech, 8 as Russian, 8 as Polish, 8 as Other, 4 as Romanian, 3 as German, 2 as Rusyn, 1 as Italian, 1 as Canadian, 1 as Greek, 1 as English and 1 as Albanian.

Note on population: The difference values of population numbers in the table "Population statistic" and in the sections "Ethnicity" & "Religion" is caused by the use of various statistical methods.

=== Religion ===
Census 2021 (1+ %)
Religion	Number	Fraction
Roman Catholic Church	1979	69%
None	571	19.91%
Not found out	193	6.73%
Evangelical Church	30	1.05%
Total	2868	

In year 2021 was 2868 people by religion 1979 from Roman Catholic Church, 571 from None, 193 from Not found out, 30 from Evangelical Church, 27 from Greek Catholic Church, 16 from Apostolic Church, 12 from Christian Congregations in Slovakia, 8 from Other, 8 from Ad hoc movements, 7 from Other and not ascertained christian church, 5 from Calvinist Church, 3 from Eastern Orthodox Church, 2 from Paganism and natural spirituality, 2 from Church of the Brethren, 2 from Buddhism, 1 from Old Catholic Church, 1 from Islam and 1 from Hinduism.

== Facilities ==
The village has a public library a gym and football pitch.

== See also ==
- List of municipalities and towns in Slovakia

== Genealogical resources ==
The records for genealogical research are available at the state archive "Statny Archiv in Nitra, Slovakia"

- Roman Catholic church records (births/marriages/deaths): 1704-1914 (parish A)
- Lutheran church records (births/marriages/deaths): 1887-1954 (parish B)
