= Armill =

Type of medieval bracelet or armlet, usually royal

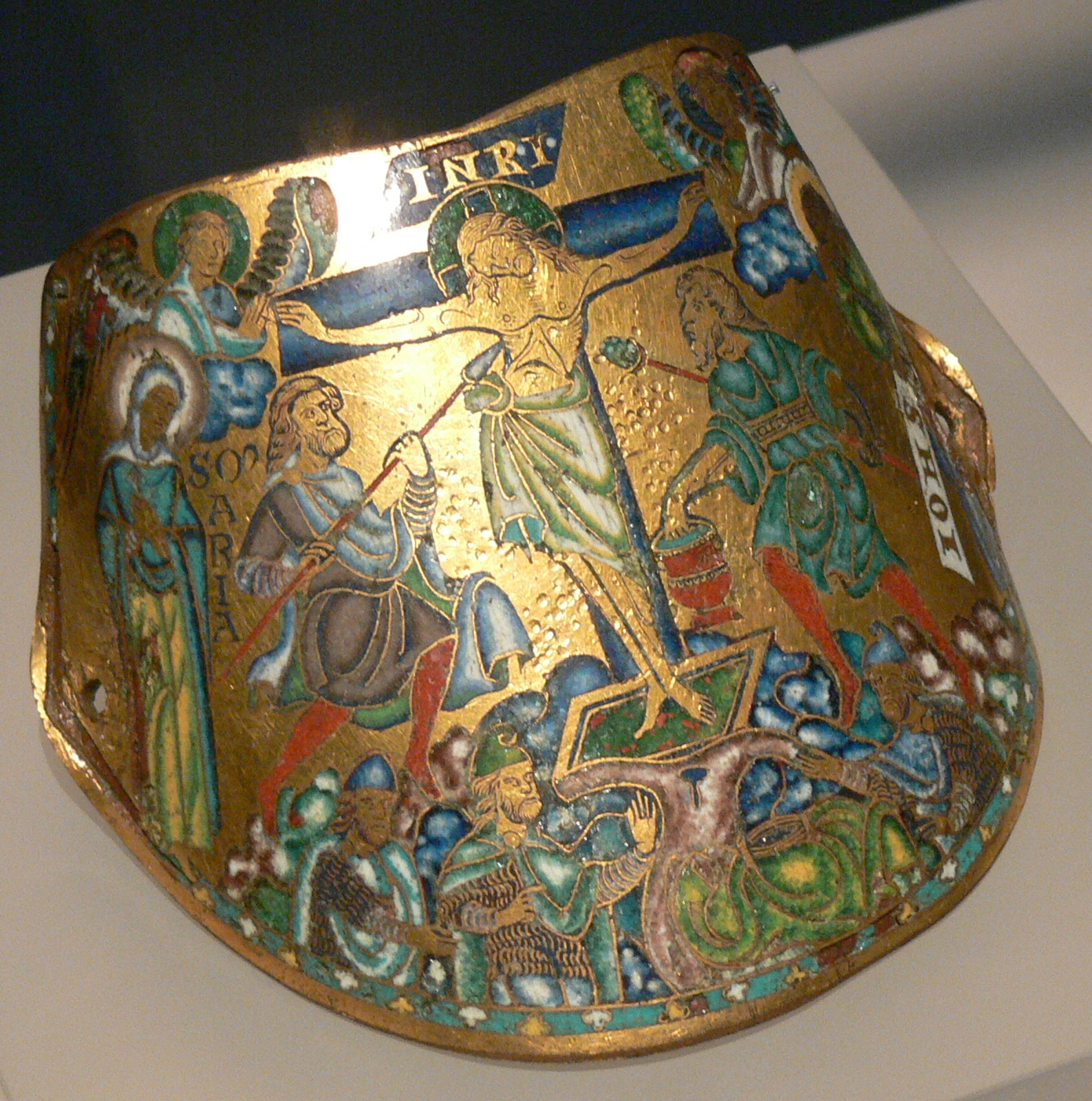
Mosan armilla, enamelled gilt-copper, 1170s, now Germanisches Nationalmuseum. The pair in the Louvre is here

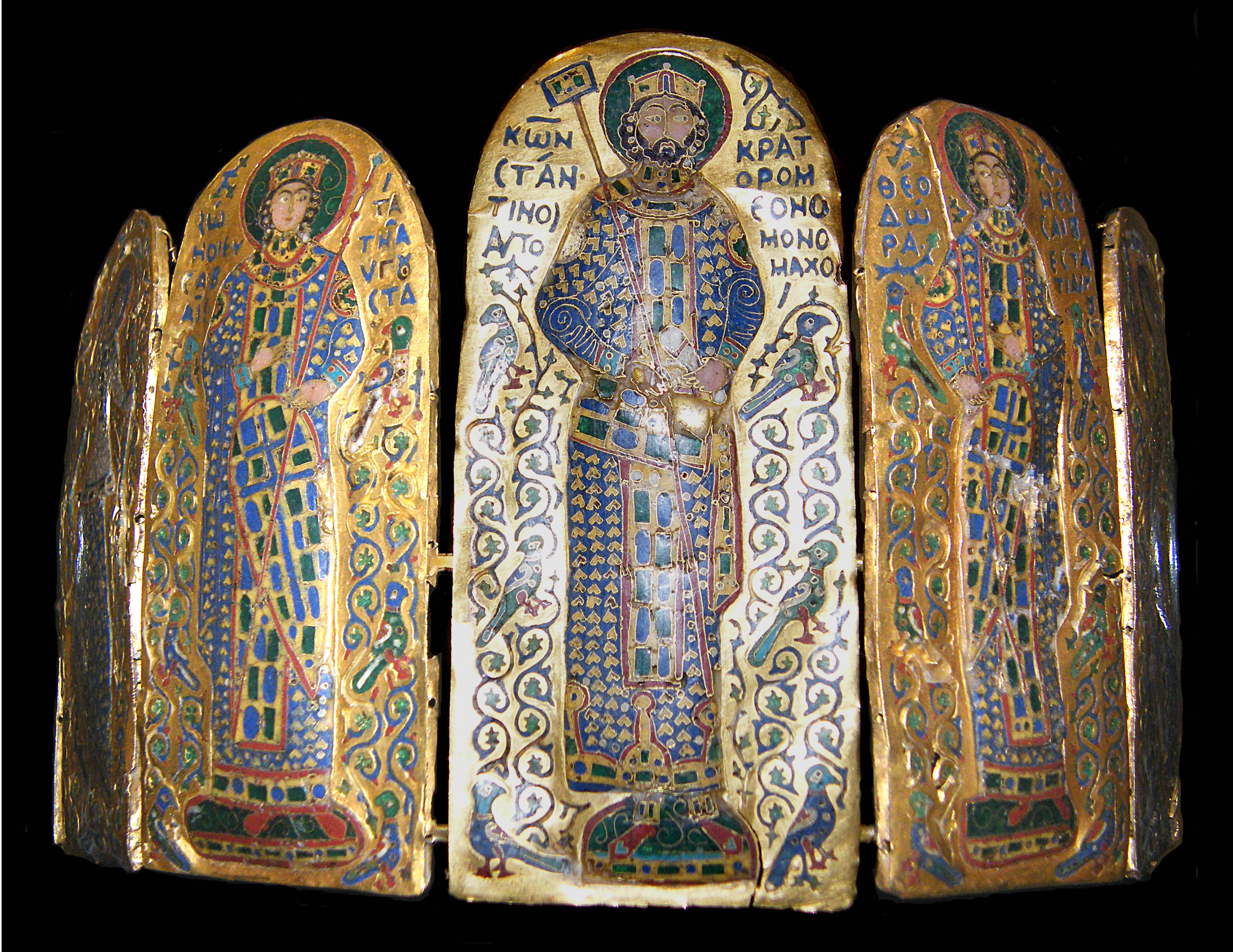
The Monomachus Crown, possibly an armilla

An armill or armilla (from the Latin: armillae remains the plural of armilla) is a type of medieval bracelet, or armlet, normally in metal and worn in pairs, one for each arm. They were usually worn as part of royal regalia, for example at a coronation, or perhaps as part of especially grand liturgical vestments. They may have been worn outside ceremonies. Armillae presumably descend from the Ancient Roman armilla, which was a form of military decoration. These in turn seem to have developed from the armlets worn by some "barbarian" nations, including the ancient Celts and Scots. The form is variable; all three examples discussed below have completely different forms.

Medieval survivals are vanishingly rare; the most famous pair is now divided between the Louvre and the Germanisches Nationalmuseum in Nuremberg (illustrated), having once been in the Hermitage Museum. These were found in the tomb of Andrei Bogolyubsky, Grand prince of Vladimir-Suzdal (d. 1174), in Vladimir, and may have been gifts from Emperor Frederick I Barbarossa (r. 1152–90), who received an embassy from the grand-prince in 1165. They are high-quality Mosan work in champlevé enamel on gilded copper, showing the Resurrection of Jesus (Louvre) and Crucifixion (Nuremberg). They probably fitted onto the shoulder, or otherwise would only go part way round the limb, and have holes (six in the Louvre's example) by which they were presumably attached to thongs or bands, or sewn to the clothing below. It is thought they were made for wear by the emperor himself.

A similar pair were drawn sometime before 1765, and described in a book published in 1790. They were then in the Imperial Treasury in Nuremberg, complete with their thongs for attachment, but they have since disappeared. These had scenes of the Nativity of Jesus and the Presentation in the Temple.

It has recently been suggested that the enamelled plates from the Monomachus Crown in Budapest showing, but probably not made for, the Byzantine emperor Constantine IX Monomachos, r. 1042–1055, may in fact come from an armilla rather than a crown, as is normally assumed. These are gold plates, decorated with cloisonné enamel, but despite the lavish materials the workmanship is far from perfect, and the inscriptions contain simple errors; they were perhaps commissioned in a hurry for a special occasion. They were found in 1860 in a field in what is now Slovakia.

The oldest surviving in the Crown Jewels of the United Kingdom, where they are usually called armills, are those of King Charles II, and the newest were created for the coronation of Queen Elizabeth II in 1953. The Elizabeth II Armills were presented to the Queen by the governments of various Commonwealth nations and are single-piece round bracelets made of 22 carat gold lined with crimson velvet, with a concealed hinge and spring catch. Most British monarchs have not worn armills when crowned though the original Charles II ones were presented to King Charles III at his coronation in Westminster Abbey in 2023.

The term "armilla" is used in the English Liber Regalis (probably 1382) to describe a stole, like the Byzantine imperial loros, but this is thought to be a confusion as to the meaning of the word.

== General and cited references ==
- Konrad Hoffmann, Florens Deuchler, eds. (1970). The Year 1200, Cloisters Studies in Medieval Art #174. New York: Metropolitan Museum of Art. ISBN 9780870990014.
- Lasko, Peter (1995). Ars Sacra, 800–1200 (2nd ed.). Yale University Press. ISBN 978-0300060485
- Ratcliffe, Edward C. (1953). The Coronation Service of Her Majesty Queen Elizabeth II. London: Society for Promoting Christian Knowledge; Cambridge: Cambridge University Press. ISBN 1-00-128823-8. pp. 31–32.
- Walter Thornbury (1878). WESTMINSTER ABBEY.—HISTORICAL CEREMONIES, &c. Old and New London (Report). Vol. 3. Centre for Metropolitan History. pp. 401–411.
