= Armilla (military decoration) =

Ancient Roman armband

An armilla (plural armillae) was an armband awarded as a military decoration (donum militarium) to soldiers of ancient Rome for conspicuous gallantry. Legionary (citizen) soldiers and non-commissioned officers below the rank of centurion were eligible for this award, but non-citizen soldiers were not. Unlike legionaries, auxiliary common soldiers did not receive individual decorations, though auxiliary officers did. However, a whole auxiliary regiment could be honoured by a title as an equivalent award, which in this case would be armillata ("awarded bracelets"), or be granted Roman citizenship en masse as a reward. This entitled an auxiliary regiment to add the appellation civium Romanorum (Roman citizens) to its list of honours.

Armillae were either gold, silver or bronze. The status of the recipient appears to have determined whether he would be granted a gold armilla or the lesser silver. Bronze armillae were given as awards for distinguished conduct to soldiers of lesser rank, but were valued no less highly for the prestige they conferred upon their owners. Armillae were usually awarded in pairs and a soldier could win more than one pair. They were not for everyday wear, but generally only worn at military parades or on dress uniform occasions like a general's Triumph, though they could also be worn at certain civic events like religious ceremonies and the games.

Roman military honours were not awarded posthumously, but those won during a soldier's lifetime were often proudly shown on his sarcophagus or cenotaph. The armillae awarded to senior centurion Marcus Caelius of Legio XVIII, for example, are evident on his funerary monument, and three pairs of armillae can be seen on the memorial panel at Villa Vallelunga in Italy which depicts the awards granted to veteran C. Vibius Macer during his years of active service.

Military armillae were modelled on those worn by the Celts. The tradition of using Celtic-style torcs and armillae as Roman military decorations had its beginnings in 361 BC when Titus Manlius Torquatus (consul 347 BC) slew a Gallic chieftain of impressive size in single combat. He then stripped the bloodstained torc from the corpse's neck and placed it around his own as a trophy. The Romans were initially daunted by the fearsome appearance of the Gauls, whose elite warriors were "richly adorned with gold necklaces and armbands". The torc was the Celtic symbol of authority and prestige. By his action, Torquatus in effect took the vanquished chieftain's power for his own, and created a potent, visible token of Roman domination. As such, over time the torc and also the armilla were adopted as official awards for valour, taking on the role of symbolic war trophies.

Armillae were made in a substantial masculine style and produced in a variety of designs: a solid, hinged cuff, sometimes inscribed with legionary emblems or decorated with incised patterns; an open-ended spiral; a chunky, rounded bracelet with open or overlapping ends; or a torc in miniature. Armillae which were open-ended or had overlapping ends often featured knobs or snake-heads as terminals.

The armilla or armill continued as a type of royal regalia, probably in both the Western and Byzantine worlds, and taking variable forms. A pair were made to be worn by the monarch at the coronation of Queen Elizabeth II in 1953. These were thick gold bracelets; earlier examples seem to have been worn on the shoulder or upper arm.

== In fiction ==
- The Capricorn Bracelet, by Rosemary Sutcliff, is a series of six stories for older children, following several generations of Roman soldiers serving at Hadrian's Wall from the 1st to the 4th centuries. The stories are linked by a family heirloom, an armilla inscribed with the Capricorn emblem of Legio II Augusta.
- Marcus Flavius Aquila, hero of Sutcliff's Eagle of the Ninth, is awarded an armilla for his part in repelling a British attack on the Roman fort of Isca Dumnoniorum, during which he is seriously wounded.
