= Horné Krškany =

Coordinates: 48°17′N 18°06′E

Horné Krškany (Hungarian: Felsőköröskény) is a little town in the Nitra region of Slovakia. The town has appeared on lists since the year 1240 and in the literature since the year 1248.

== Church ==
St Mary's in Horné Krškany is a small, unprepossessing building on a low rise west of the main road; the front section is an ordinary Baroque affair. But the rear section is much older: recent archaeological work suggests it dates from the thirteenth century, and perhaps even earlier.

This discovery is in part thanks to the railway line which runs literally past the front door of the church.

In 1908, an ember from a passing steam train set fire to the church's straw roof, and it remained a ruin until the 1930s, when restoration work in the chancel revealed a fresco on the rear wall. Little significance was attached to it at the time: a curtain was hung to cover the unsightly blemishes.

It is only in the last three years, at the instigation of the present priest, a history enthusiast, that the church has been properly examined by archaeologists. In two years of painstaking work, the floor of the chancel has been lifted, uncovering a surprisingly deep original level, and the fresco has begun to be fully revealed.

The style is early Gothic, suggesting it was painted in the late thirteenth century. Its main part depicts the Last Supper, a fairly common theme for what is regarded as a typical, if rare, piece of village church art.
