= St. Stephen's Church, Nitra =

Church in Nitra, Slovakia

Coordinates: 48°18′43.26″N 18°04′54.95″E

St. Stephen's Church is a protected cultural monument situated in Nitra. It was built in the 11th or 12th century. In early 18th century the church was renewed to its final Baroque style. This site is a rare medieval structure with the sanctuary beneath a Baroque semicircular vault with lunettes. In the interior of the church parts of the Romanesque frescoes are still visible. The church was rebuilt by František Maťašovský in 1720.
