= Shulyky =

Ukrainian flatbread

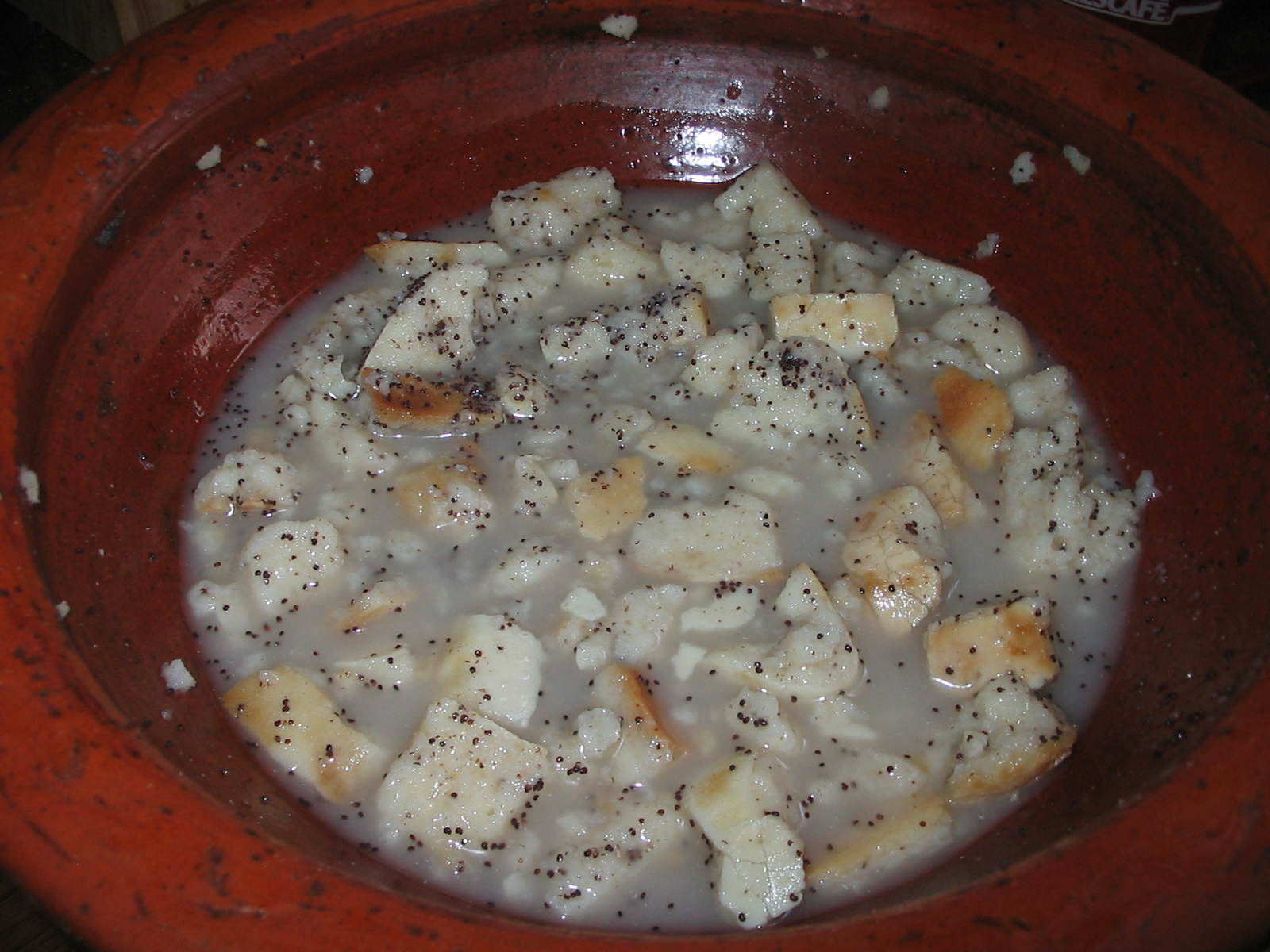
Shulyky

Shulyky (Ukrainian: шулики), shulyaky, also lamantsi, is a traditional Ukrainian dish usually eaten during the Makoviy or Spas holiday. It is a wheat-based flatbread cut into small pieces that is topped with diluted honey and poppy seeds.

== Overview ==
The dough is typically made with flour, egg, water and washed poppy seeds. The poppy seeds are may be ground in a makitra. It is then baked in an oven and topped with a honey-poppy seed mixture.

The dough for the shulyky was made lean because there was a two-week fast on Spas.

== History ==
A similar dish of unleavened bread with honey and poppy seeds is mentioned in the Deeds of Theodosius of Pechersk, dating from the 12-13th century.

Shulyky are mantioned in Ivan Kotlyarevsky's Eneida, as well as in works by Hryhorii Kvitka-Osnovianenko. A recipe of shulyky was recorded by Mykola Markevych in the mid-19th century.

== Gallery ==
Olena Scherban talking about Makoviy and shulyky

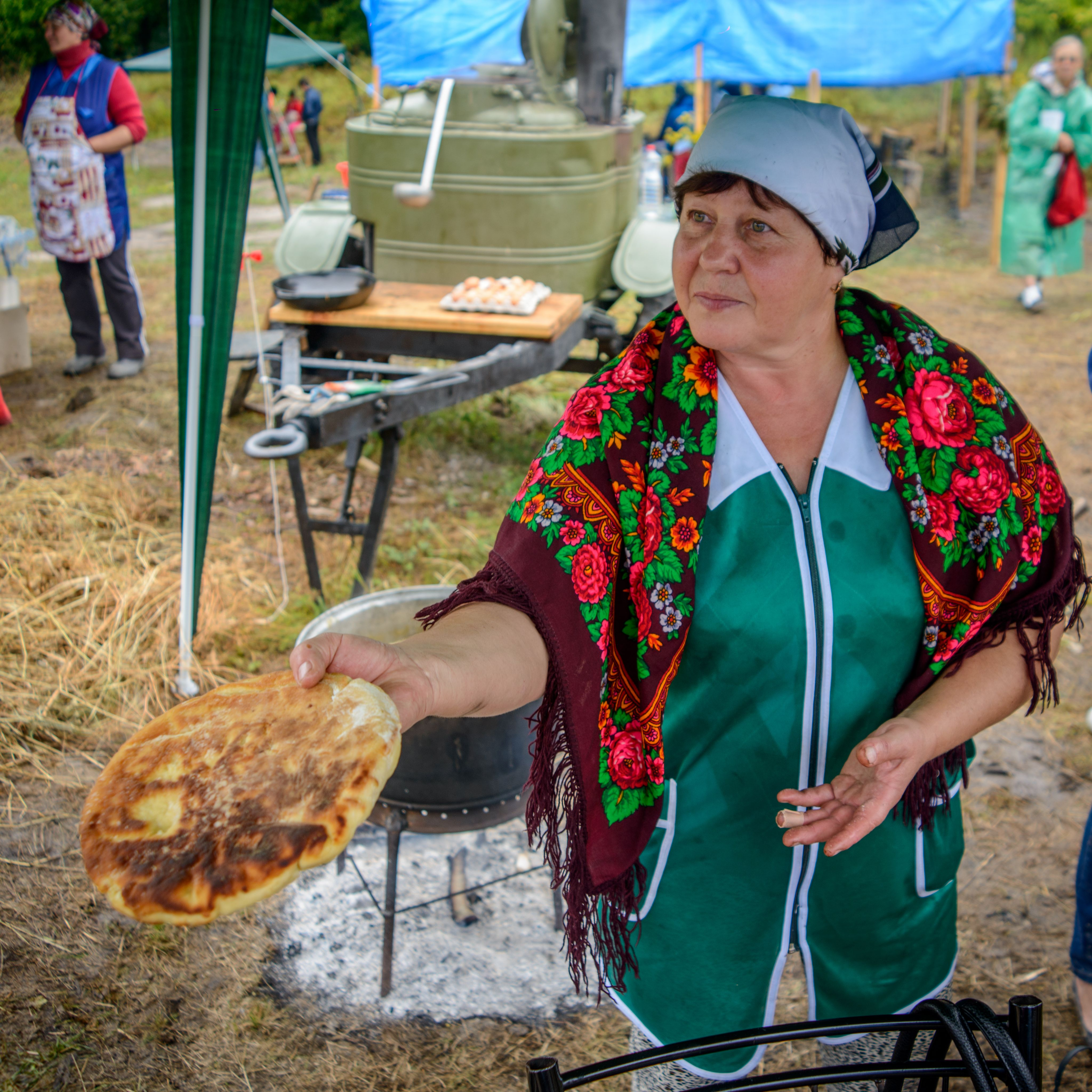
Flatbread for shulyky

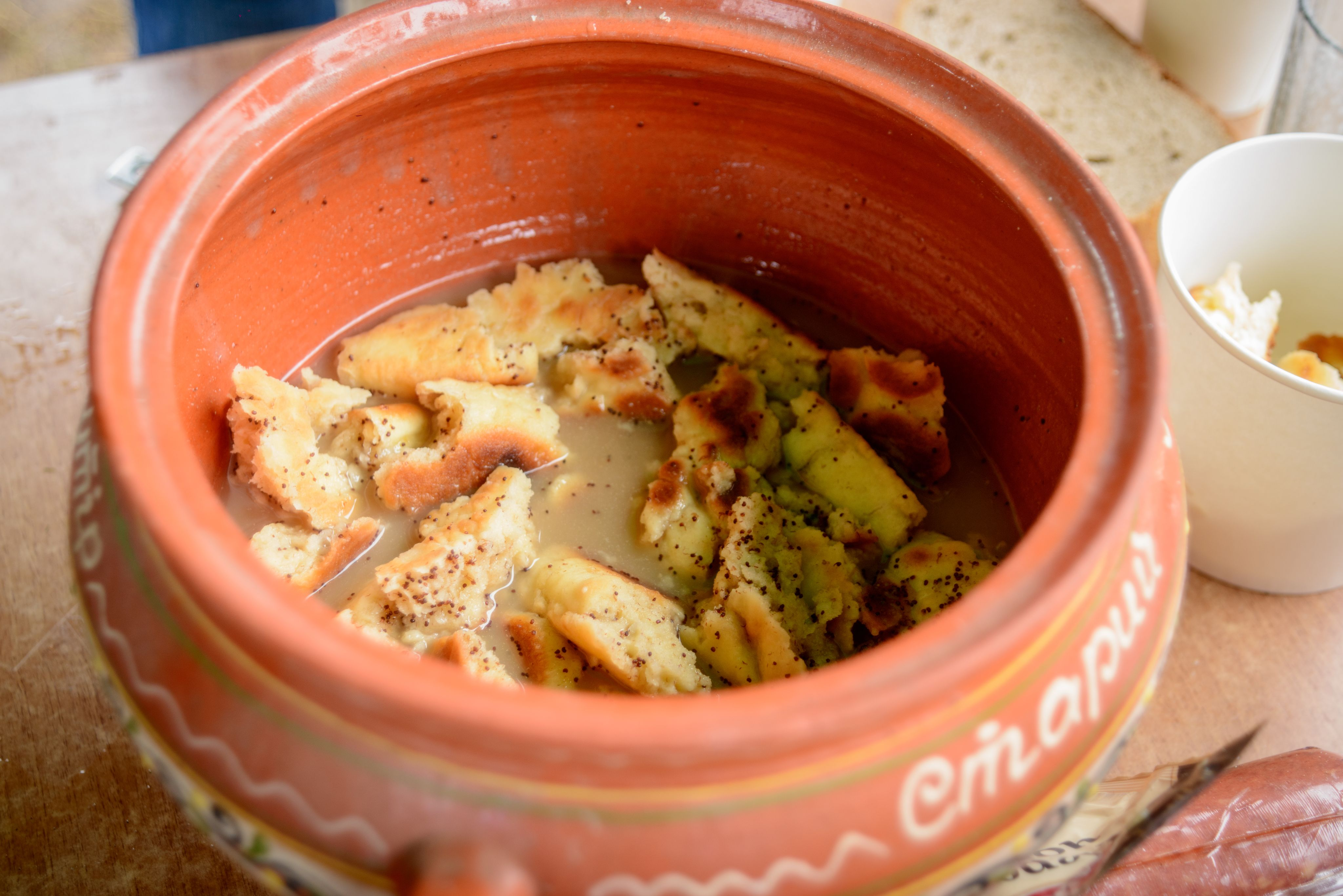

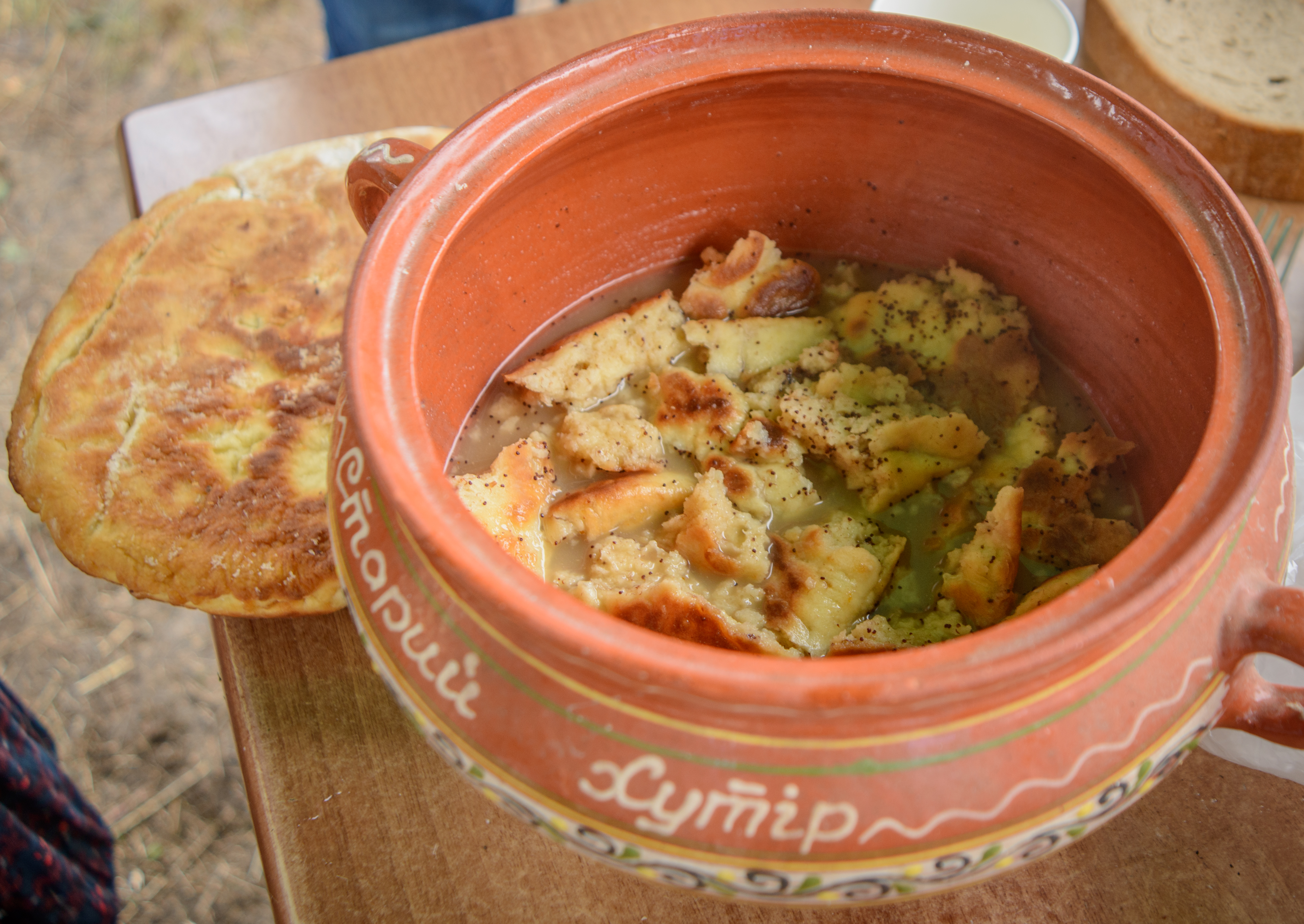
