= Sergey Tsukanov =

Soviet-Russian serial killer (born 1973)

- Born: Sergey Nikolayevich Tsukanov; 22 June 1973 (age 53); Tula, Tula Oblast, RSFSR
- Other names: "The Cemetery Maniac" "The Maniac from Soap Mountain" "The Maniac from 10 B"
- Conviction: Murder x3
- Penalty: 10 years imprisonment (first murders); Involuntary commitment (later murders)

Details
- Victims: 8
- Span of crimes: 1989 – 1991; 1998 – 1999
- Country: Tula Oblast, Soviet Union, later Russia
- Date apprehended: 29 March 1999
- Imprisoned at: Oryol

Sergey Nikolayevich Tsukanov (Russian: Сергей Николаевич Цуканов; born 22 June 1973), known as The Cemetery Maniac (Russian: Кладбищенский маньяк), is a Soviet-Russian serial killer and rapist who raped and killed eight women in Likhvinka and Tula during two distinct periods. The first series of murders occurred between 1989 and 1991 when he was only 16 years old, and the second took place between 1998 and 1999. In January 2000, a panel of judges at the Tula Oblast Court declared Tsukanov insane and ordered him to undergo compulsory treatment in a psychiatric clinic.

== Biography ==
Sergey Tsukanov was born on 22 June 1973 in Tula. He was the only child, living with his parents and paternal grandmother in a one-room apartment. His father had a criminal record. His grandmother, known for her dominant temperament, constantly criticized and accused Tsukanov and his parents; growing up, Tsukanov developed a deep-seated hatred against her. In his teens, he began exhibiting misogyny toward older women who resembled his grandmother.

Tsukanov attended School No. 13 in Tula, where, in 1988, he attacked the head teacher in the school restroom and attempted to rape her. However, she recognized him, which forced him to flee. The school administration covered up the incident and never reported it to the authorities, but Tsukanov was sent to a mental health clinic for a forensic psychiatric evaluation.

During one examination, Tsukanov stated that his motive for the attack was revenge for failing grades. However, during the struggle, he became aroused by and decided to rape her. The psychiatrists diagnosed Tsukanov with a mild intellectual disability, but declared him sufficiently sane and released him.

Tsukanov returned to school, where he soon began soliciting sexual relations with one of his classmates. After being rejected, his mental state degraded, and he began engaging in self-harm by cutting himself with a knife and other sharp objects.

== Murders ==
=== 1989-1991 ===
Tsukanov committed his first murder on 24 December 1989. His victim was a 54-year-old woman, a weigher at a flour mill worker in the village of Likhvinka. During the investigation, an mill employee with a prior criminal record who had previous conflicts with the victim was considered a suspect, but he provided a solid alibi and was thus eliminated as a suspect.

On 28 November 1990, Tsukanov attacked a 49-year-old female factory worker in Tula en route to her home, while she was crossing a bridge over the Voronka River. During the attack, he raped her and then killed her by stabbing her in the back with a folding knife, which he left next to her body.

On 18 March 1991, Tsukanov attacked a 51-year-old woman near the railroad tracks near the flour mill. However, the victim resisted and forced Tsukanov to flee.

On 23 March 1991, five days after the last attack, Tsukanov attacked a 52-year-old woman near the same railroad tracks. During the attack, he raped her, after which he stabbed her several times with a homemade knife he had sharpened at work. She died two days later in the hospital, having already compiled a descriptive profile of the perpetrator.

=== First arrest and imprisonment ===
While investigating the previous attack, the investigators established that the dropped knife had been welded with rebar. While conducting searches at the various factories around Tula, which had welding machines and similar devices, the police found that similar knives were used by the teenage workers at the local railway depot. Following this discovery, the investigators began reviewing all individuals previously convicted of sexual offenses and registered with psychiatric clinics for possible involvement. During the investigation, the police learned of the 1988 attack on the teacher by Tsukanov, after which he became a suspect.

On 28 August 1991, shortly after graduating from high school, Tsukanov was arrested. While police found no incriminating evidence, he was identified by depot workers as the customer who ordered the knife, as well as by the surviving victim. He then confessed to three murders.

At the request of Tsukanov's lawyers, he was ordered to undergo a forensic psychiatric examination at the Kursk Psychiatric Hospital; he was declared sane. However, this verdict was disputed by Tsukanov, his parents, and his lawyer, with the latter arguing that the examination had been rife with errors. At the upcoming trial, the court could not impose the death penalty on him, as he was a minor at the time of his crimes. On 23 December 1991, Tsukanov was found guilty of all charges and sentenced to ten years imprisonment, the maximum sentence applicable to a minor at the time.

After his conviction, Tsukanov was transferred to the Novomoskovsk corrective labour colony, where he met and befriended fellow inmate Anatoly Denisov. With Denisov's help, Tsukanov learned carpentry while in prison and worked in this profession for the rest of his sentence. During his imprisonment, he was considered a model prisoner and was never reprimanded by prison officials, which influenced the decision to grant him early parole. He was released on 18 February 1998.

=== 1998-1999 ===
After his release, Tsukanov returned to his parents in Tula. A few months later, he found work as a carpenter at a local company and met a woman who soon became his partner. However, Tsukanov soon broke up with her and began abusing alcohol. Soon after, he began his second killing spree. The second series of murders took place at the Smolenskoye Cemetery in Tula, popularly known as "Soap Mountain", which later earned Tsukanov the nicknames "The Cemetery Maniac" and "The Maniac from Soap Mountain".

On 19 August 1998, during the Apple Feast of the Saviour, Tsukanov, intoxicated, found himself at the cemetery where he encountered 80-year-old Anastasia Sazykina, who had come to visit the graves of her relatives. Tsukanov attacked her, raped her, and bludgeoned her to death with a piece of metal pipe.

On 11 October, Tsukanov returned to the cemetery. This time, he attacked 72-year-old Vera Yevplova, raped her, and bludgeoned her to death with a shovel she had brought with her.

A few days later, on 30 October, Tsukanov attacked 86-year-old Klavdiya Vlasova, raping her and stabbing her with her own umbrella.

On 16 November, Tsukanov killed 65-year-old Nadezhda Romanova, who was visiting the cemetery with her husband and sister-in-law. The three walked the same route together for some time, after which Romanova left them and went to another section of the cemetery, where one of her friends was buried. Tsukanov tracked down Romanova and attacked her, beating and raping her. He then attempted to leave the scene but was spotted by cemetery workers. The workers' attention was drawn to Tsukanov's unkempt appearance and the dirt on the knees of his trousers. Suspecting him of committing a crime, one of the workers headed toward the spot from which Tsukanov had emerged and, a few dozen meters away, discovered Romanova's body. A group of men then attempted to pursue Tsukanov, but he had already left the cemetery grounds. During the investigation, a composite sketch of Tsukanov was compiled from witnesses, and investigators reviewed several thousand individuals with mental health conditions and those who had served sentences for sexual offenses.

Tsukanov's last victim was 67-year-old Larisa Golubkova, whom his mother knew. On 28 March 1999, Tsukanov and his parents were invited to a wake organized by Golubkova for the death of her son. After the wake later that evening, Tsukanov, intoxicated, went to Golubkova's front door and demanded a bottle of vodka; Golubkova refused. Enraged, he attacked Golubkova, raped her, and then stabbed her several times with a knife, killing her.

=== Second arrest and trial ===
In an attempt to cover his tracks, he unsuccessfully attempted to set Golubkova's house on fire, but was spotted by her neighbours, who called the police. Tsukanov was arrested the following day. As part of the investigation into the recent slew of murders, a blood sample was taken from him, matching his DNA to all of the other crime scenes. Cemetery workers also identified him as Romanova's killer. Upon learning of this, Tsukanov confessed to five murders. During interrogation, he insisted that he suffered from dissociative identity disorder and had problems with self-control.

In mid-1999, Tsukanov's lawyers filed a motion at a pre-trial hearing for a forensic psychiatric examination to determine his sanity, which was granted. In the autumn of that year, Tsukanov was transferred to the Serbsky Center in Moscow, where specialists worked with him for the next two months. The end results concluded that Tsukanov suffered from a form of schizophrenia that rendered him unable to comprehend the nature and social danger of his actions. Based on this, on 20 January 2000, by decision of the panel of judges of the Tula Oblast Court, Tsukanov was declared insane, relieved of criminal liability, and ordered that he spend the rest of his life in a psychiatric clinic. Following this verdict, Tsukanov was transferred to the intensive care unit of a clinic located in Oryol, and after October 2006, no reliable information about his further fate has been uncovered.

== See also ==
- List of Russian serial killers
