= Constantine VII =

Byzantine emperor from 913 to 959

- Emperor and Autocrat of the Romans
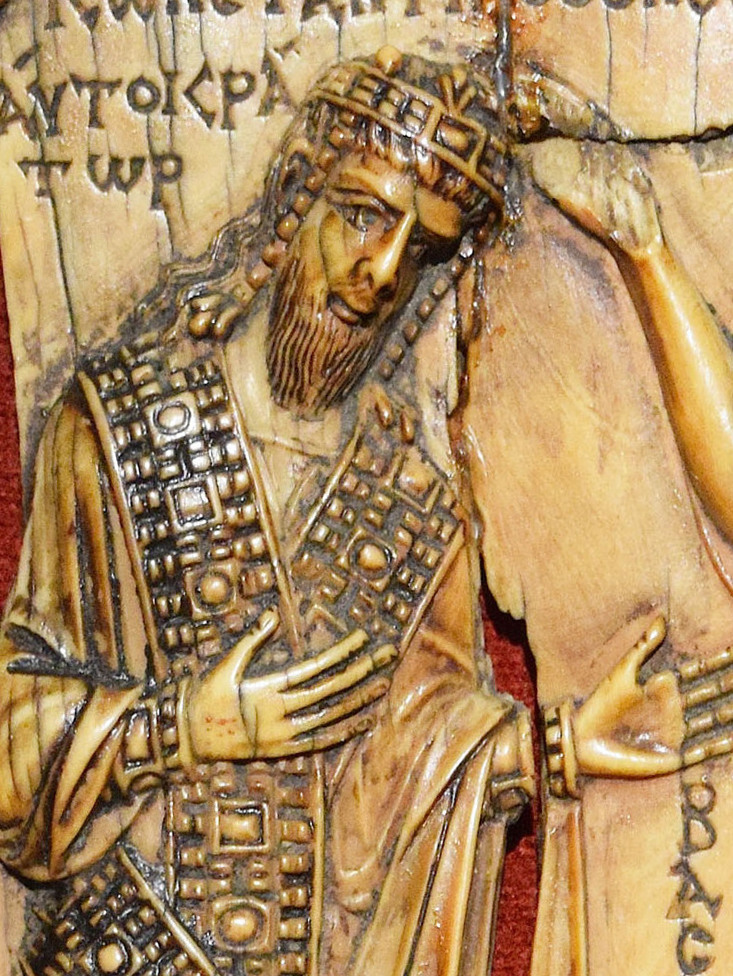
- Constantine VII crowned by Christ, detail of an ivory plaque, Pushkin Museum, AD 945

Byzantine emperor
- Reign: 6 June 913 – 9 November 959 (alone from 27 January 945)
- Coronation: 15 May 908
- Predecessor: Alexander
- Successor: Romanos II
- Co-emperors: Romanos I (920–944); Christopher (921–931); Stephen and Constantine (924–945); Romanos II (945–959)
- Born: 17 May 905; Constantinople
- Died: 9 November 959 (aged 54); Constantinople
- Spouse: Helena Lekapene
- Issue Detail: Romanos II; Theodora
- Dynasty: Macedonian dynasty
- Father: Leo VI
- Mother: Zoe Karbonopsina
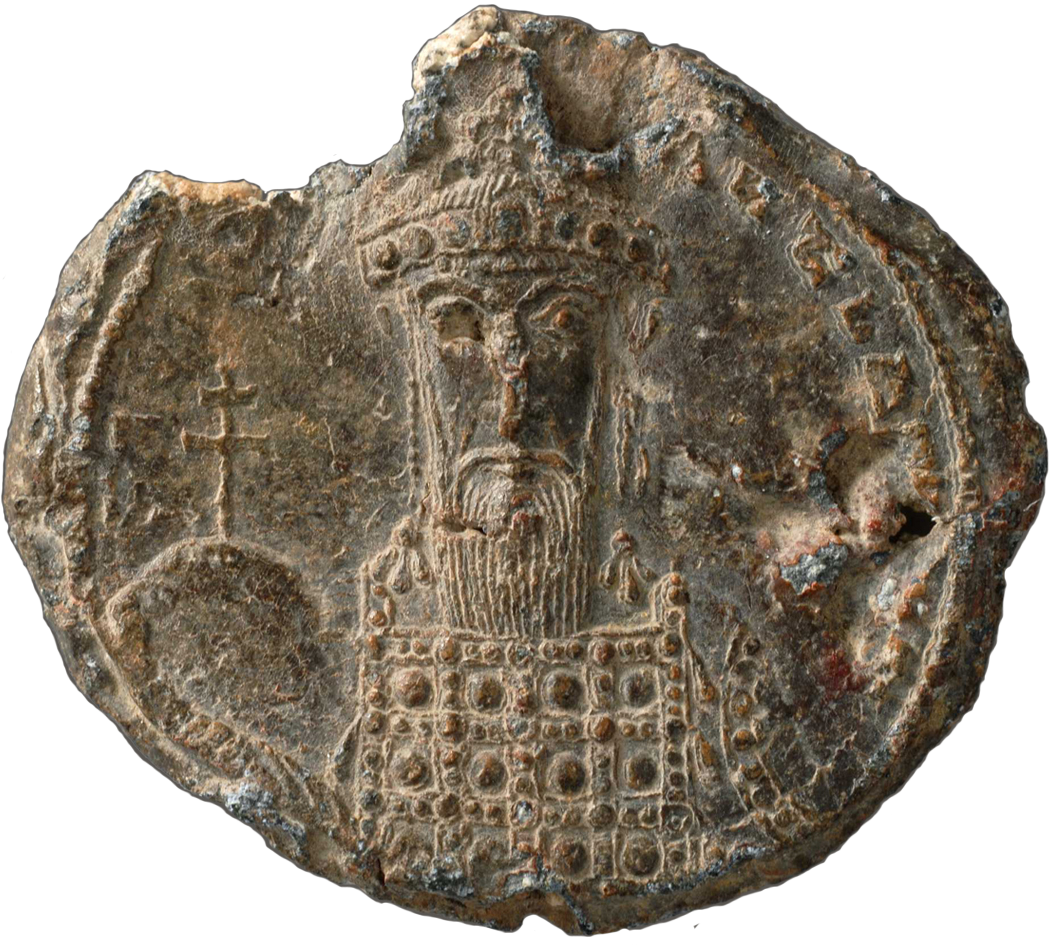
- Seal

Constantine VII Porphyrogenitus (Medieval Greek: Κωνσταντῖνος Πορφυρογέννητος, romanized: Kōnstantīnos Porphyrogénnētos; 17 May 905 – 9 November 959) was the fourth Byzantine emperor of the Macedonian dynasty, reigning from 6 June 913 to 9 November 959. He was the son of Emperor Leo VI and his fourth wife, Zoe Karbonopsina, and the nephew of his predecessor Alexander.

Most of his reign was dominated by co-regents: from 913 until 919 he was under the regency of his mother, while from 920 until 945 he shared the throne with Romanos Lekapenos, whose daughter Helena he married, and his sons. Constantine VII is best known for the Geoponika (τά γεωπονικά), an important agronomic treatise compiled during his reign, and three, perhaps four, books; De Administrando Imperio (bearing in Greek the heading Πρὸς τὸν ἴδιον υἱὸν Ῥωμανόν), De Ceremoniis (Περὶ τῆς Βασιλείου Τάξεως), De Thematibus (Περὶ θεμάτων Άνατολῆς καὶ Δύσεως), and Vita Basilii (Βίος Βασιλείου), though his authorship of the Vita Basilii is not certain.

The epithet porphyrogenitus alludes to the Purple chamber of the imperial palace, decorated with porphyry, where legitimate children of reigning emperors were normally born. Constantine was also born in this room, although his mother Zoe had not been married to Leo at that time. Nevertheless, the epithet allowed him to underline his position as the legitimate son, as opposed to all others who claimed the throne during his lifetime.

== Life ==
=== Regency ===
Constantine was born in Constantinople on 17/18 May 905, an illegitimate son of Leo VI before an uncanonical fourth marriage. To help legitimize him, his mother gave birth to him in the Purple Room of the imperial palace, hence his nickname Porphyrogennetos. He was elevated to the throne as a two-year-old child by his father and uncle on 15 May 908 (Whitsunday).

In early 913, as his uncle Alexander lay dying, he appointed a seven-man regency council for Constantine. It was headed by the Patriarch Nicholas Mystikos, the two magistroi John Eladas and Stephen, the rhaiktor John Lazanes, the otherwise obscure Euthymius and Alexander's henchmen Basilitzes and Gabrielopoulos. Following Alexander's death (6 June), the new and shaky regime survived the attempted usurpation of Constantine Doukas, and Patriarch Nicholas Mystikos quickly assumed a dominant position among the regents.

Patriarch Nicholas was presently forced to make peace with Tsar Simeon of Bulgaria, whom he reluctantly recognized as Bulgarian emperor. Because of this unpopular concession, Patriarch Nicholas was driven out of the regency by Constantine's mother Zoe. She was no more successful with the Bulgarians, who defeated her main supporter, the general Leo Phokas, in 917.

In March 919, she was replaced as regent by the admiral Romanos Lekapenos, who married his daughter Helena Lekapene to Constantine. Romanos used his position to advance to the ranks of basileopatōr in April 919, to kaisar (Caesar) on 24 September 920, and finally to co-emperor on 17 December 920. Thus, just short of reaching nominal majority, Constantine was eclipsed by a senior emperor.

Constantine's youth had been a sad one due to his unpleasant appearance, his taciturn nature, and his relegation to the third level of succession, behind Christopher Lekapenos, the eldest son of Romanos I Lekapenos. Nevertheless, he was a very intelligent young man with a large range of interests, and he dedicated those years to studying the court's ceremony.

=== Senior emperor ===
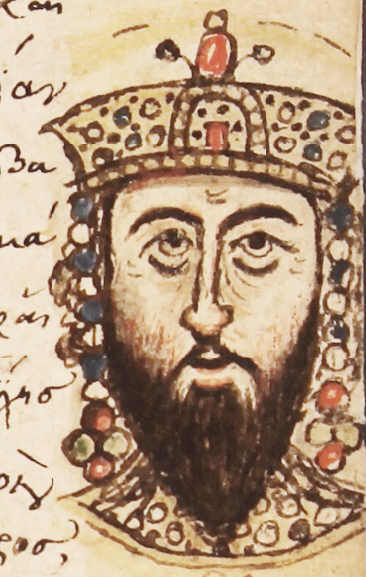
Depiction of Constantine VII in a 15th-century codex.

Romanos kept and maintained power until 16/20 December 944, when he was deposed by his sons, the co-emperors Stephen and Constantine. (Note: Constantine Lekapenos is not given a regnal number because he never became senior emperor (even though he briefly usurped his father), as per Byzantine historiography.) Romanos spent the last years of his life in exile on the Island of Prote as a monk and died on 15 June 948. With the help of his wife, Constantine VII succeeded in removing his brothers-in-law, and on 27 January 945, Constantine VII became sole emperor at the age of 39, after a life spent in the shadow. Several months later, on 6 April (Easter), Constantine VII crowned his own son Romanos II co-emperor. Having never exercised executive authority, Constantine remained primarily devoted to his scholarly pursuits and delegated his authority to bureaucrats and generals, as well as to his energetic wife Helena Lekapene.

In 947, Constantine VII ordered the immediate restitution of all peasant lands, without compensation; by the end of his reign, the condition of the landed peasantry, which formed the foundation of the whole economic and military strength of the Empire, was better off than it had been for a century.

In 949, Constantine launched a new fleet of 100 ships (20 dromons, 64 chelandia, and 10 galleys) against the Arab corsairs hiding in Crete, but like his father's attempt to retake the island in 911, this attempt also failed.

On the Eastern frontier things went better, even if with alternate success. In the same year, the Byzantines conquered Germanicea, repeatedly defeated the enemy armies, and in 952 they crossed the upper Euphrates. But in 953, the Hamdanid amir Sayf al-Dawla retook Germanicea and entered the imperial territory. The land in the east was eventually recovered by Nikephoros Phokas, who conquered Adata, in northern Syria, in 958, and by the general John Tzimiskes, who one year later captured Samosata, in northern Mesopotamia. An Arab fleet was also destroyed by Greek fire in 957.

Constantine had active diplomatic relationships with foreign courts, including those of the caliph of Cordoba Abd ar-Rahman III and of Otto I, Holy Roman Emperor. In the autumn of 957 Constantine was visited by Olga of Kiev, regent of the Kievan Rus'. The reasons for this voyage have never been clarified; but she was baptised a Christian with the name Helena, and sought Christian missionaries to encourage her people to adopt Christianity. According to legends, Constantine VII fell in love with Olga, but she found a way to refuse him by tricking him into becoming her godfather. When she was baptized, she said it was inappropriate for a godfather to marry his goddaughter.

Constantine VII died at Constantinople on 9 November 959 and was succeeded by his son Romanos II. It was rumored that he had been poisoned by his son or his daughter-in-law Theophano.

== Madrid Skylitzes' depictions of Constantine ==
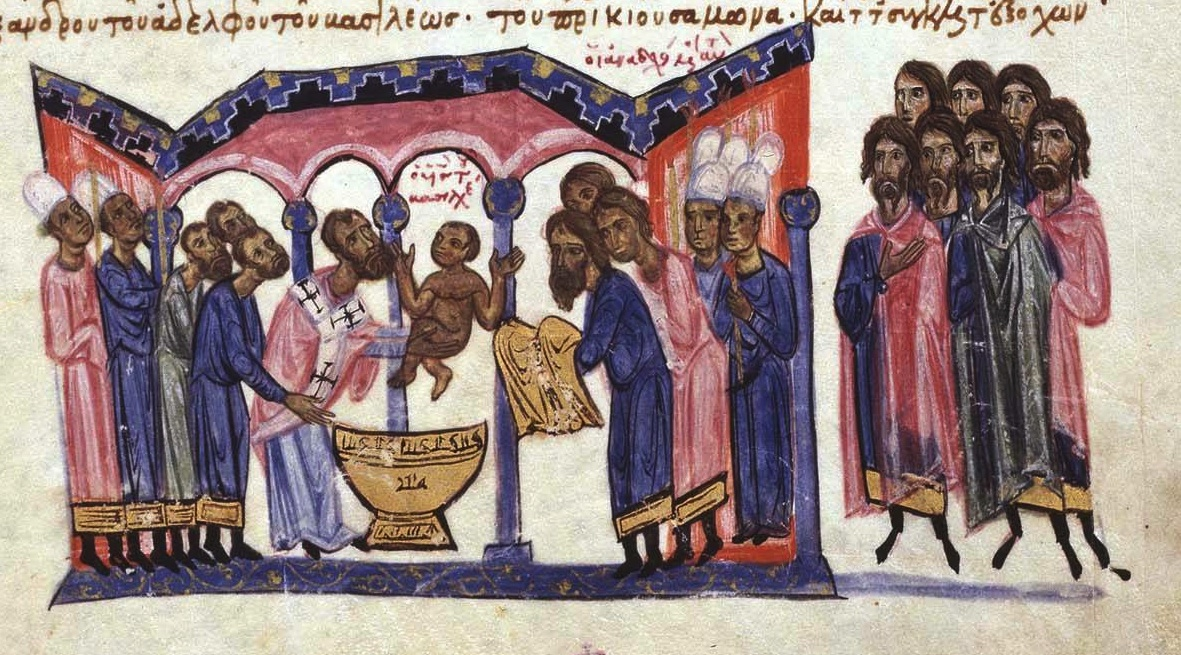
Baptism of Constantine VII by Patriarch Nicholas Mystikos.

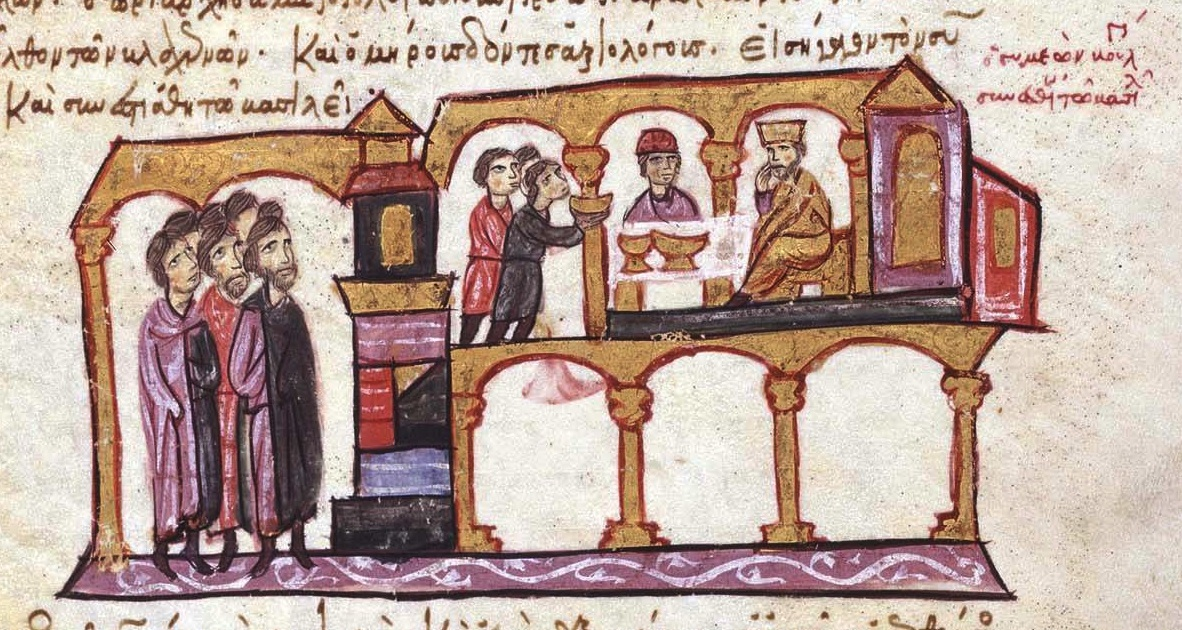
Constantine VII dining with Simeon of Bulgaria. (Note: The scene is clearly imaginary, as Constantine was only 8 years old at the time.)

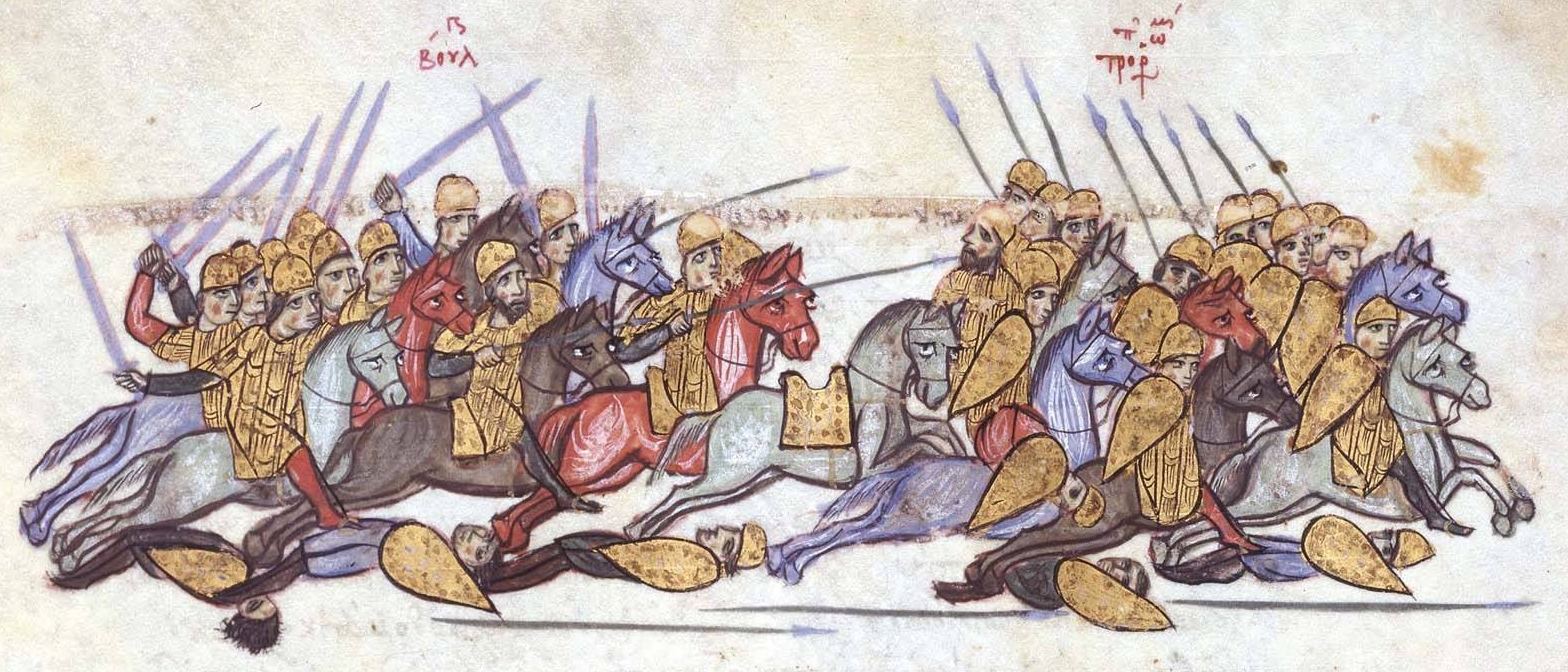
The Bulgarians crush the Byzantine army led by Leo Phokas at Anchialus.

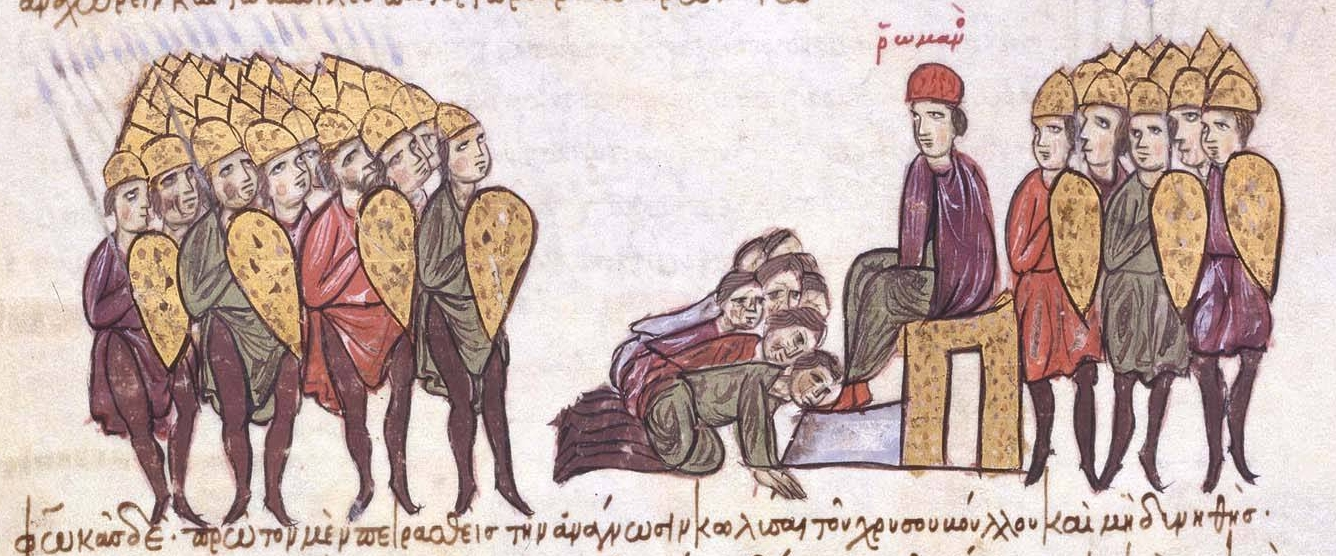
The supporters of Leo Phokas bow to the usurper Romanos Lekapenos.

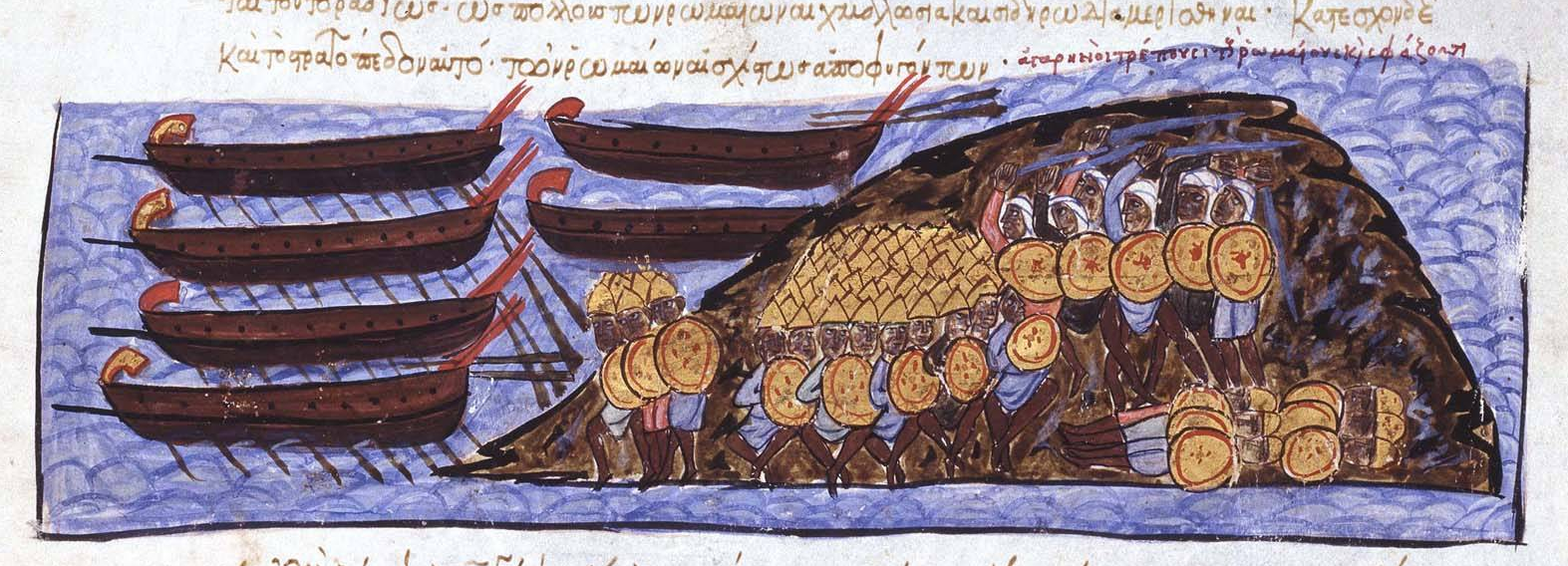
The Saracens of Crete foil a Byzantine attempt at reconquest.

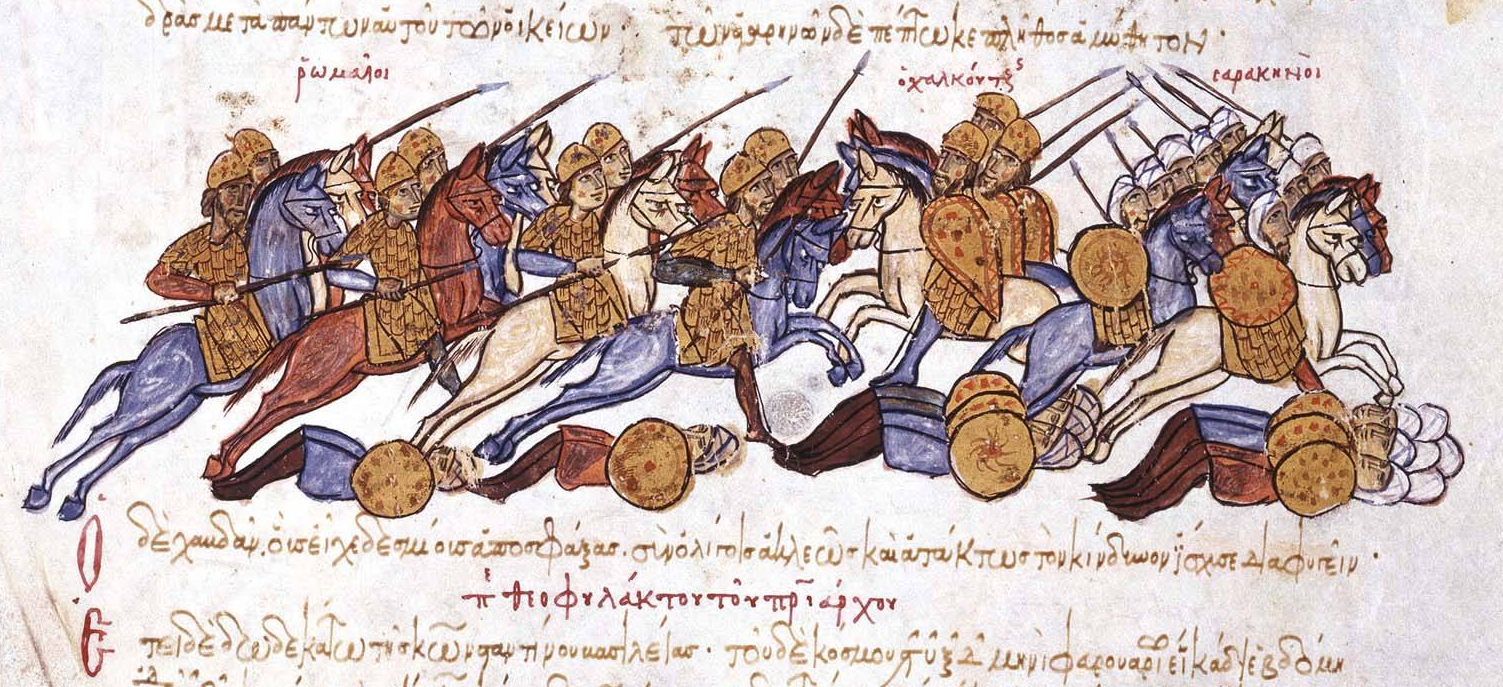
Leo Phokas the Younger defeats the Hamdanid Emir Sayf al-Dawla.

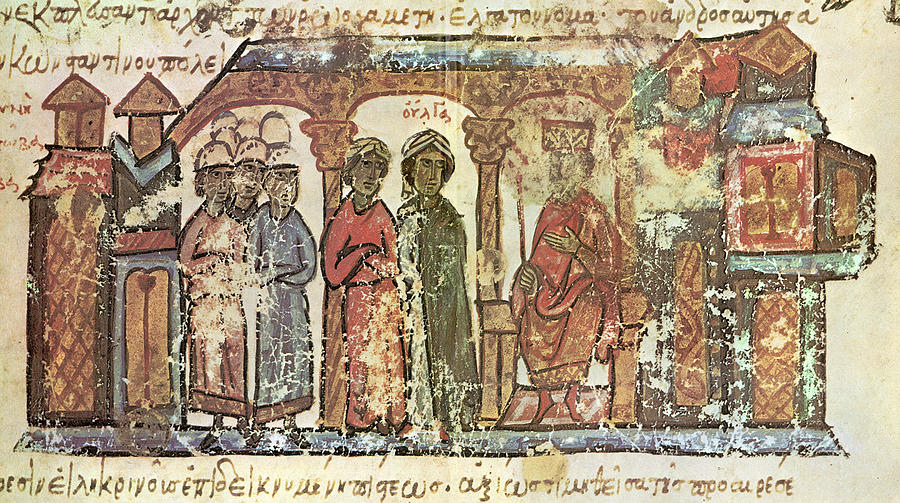
Olga of Kiev is received at the emperor's court.

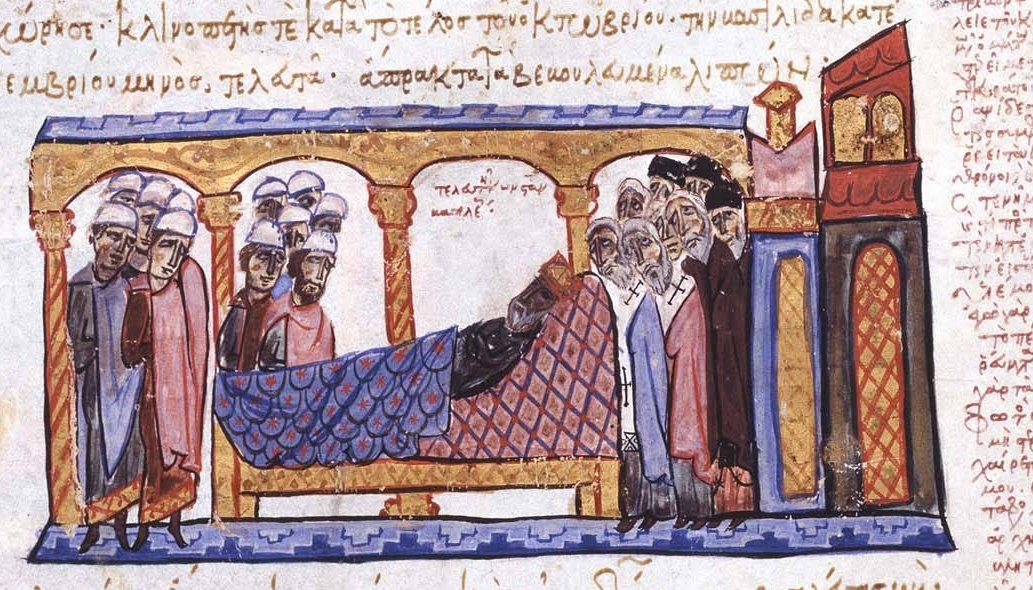
The Madrid Skylitzes' depiction of Constantine on his deathbed

== Literary activity ==
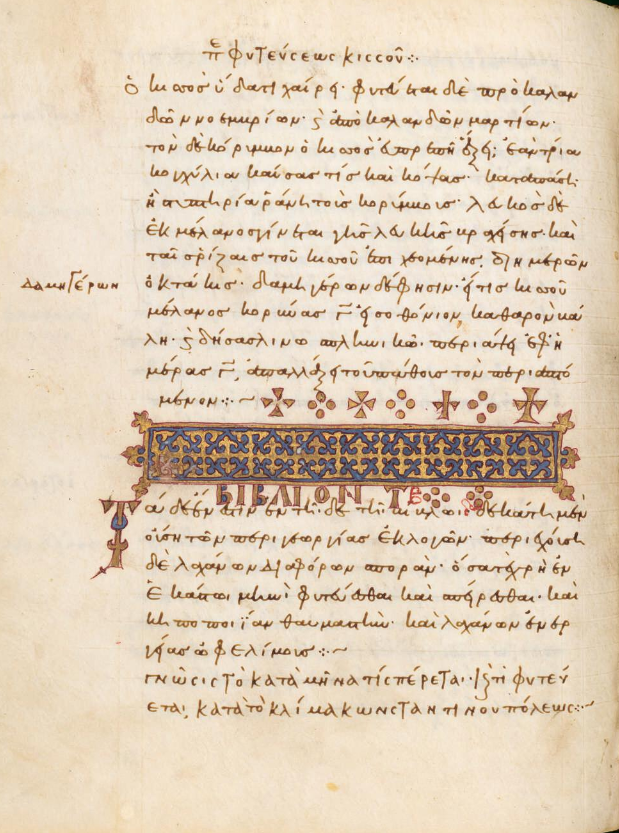
A gardening calendar from the Geoponika, MS.Laur.Plut.59.32 f.171v

Constantine VII was recognized as a writer and scholar, surrounding himself with educated people of the Imperial Court. He wrote, or had commissioned, the works Geoponika ("On Agriculture", in Greek Τὰ γεωπονικά), a compilation of agronomic works from earlier Greek and Punic texts that are otherwise lost; De Ceremoniis ("On Ceremonies", in Greek, Περὶ τῆς βασιλείου τάξεως), describing the kinds of court ceremonies (also described later in a more negative light by Liutprand of Cremona); De Administrando Imperio ("On the Administration of the Empire", bearing in Greek the heading Πρὸς τὸν ἴδιον ὑιὸν Ρωμανόν), giving advice on running the Empire internally and on fighting external enemies; a history of the Empire covering events following the death of the chronographer Theophanes the Confessor in 817; and Excerpta Historica ("Excerpts from the Histories"), a collection of excerpts from ancient historians (many of whose works are now lost) in four volumes (1. De legationibus. 2. De virtutibus et vitiis. 3. De insidiis. 4. De sententiis). In The Manuscript Tradition of Polybius, John Michael Moore (CUP, 1965) provides a useful summary of the commission by Porphyrogenitus of the Constantine Excerpts:

He felt that the historical studies were being seriously neglected, mainly because of the bulk of the histories. He therefore decided that a selection under fifty-three titles should be made from all the important historians extant in Constantinople; thus he hoped to assemble in a more manageable compass the most valuable parts of each author. ... Of the fifty-three titles into which the excerpts were divided, only six have survived: de Virtutibus et Vitiis; de Sententiis; de Insidiis; de Strategematis; de Legationibus Gentium ad Romanos; de Legationibus Romanorum ad Gentes. The titles of only about half the remaining forty-seven sections are known.

Also amongst his historical works is a history eulogizing the reign and achievements of his grandfather, Basil I (Vita Basilii, Βίος Βασιλείου). These books are a source of information about nations neighbouring the Empire as well as into the Emperor himself.

In his book, A Short History of Byzantium, John Julius Norwich refers to Constantine VII as "The Scholar Emperor". Norwich describes Constantine:

He was, we are told, a passionate collector—not only of books and manuscripts but works of art of every kind; more remarkable still for a man of his class, he seems to have been an excellent painter. He was the most generous of patrons—to writers and scholars, artists and craftsmen. Finally, he was an excellent Emperor: a competent, conscientious and hard-working administrator and an inspired picker of men, whose appointments to military, naval, ecclesiastical, civil and academic posts were both imaginative and successful. He did much to develop higher education and took a special interest in the administration of justice.

== Family ==
By his wife Helena Lekapene, the daughter of Emperor Romanos I, Constantine VII had several children:

1. Leo (c. 939–944), who died young.
2. Romanos II (939–963), who succeeded as emperor.
3. Zoe, sent to a convent.
4. Theodora, who married emperor John I Tzimiskes.
5. Agatha, sent to a convent.
6. Theophano, sent to a convent.
7. Anna, sent to a convent.

== Legacy ==
Constantine VII is still remembered in the Eastern Orthodox liturgy when the transfer of the Holy Mandylion is celebrated on 16 August in the Julian calendar which corresponds to 29 August in the Gregorian calendar. This feast is part of the Nut Feast of the Saviour for Slavs.

== Solidi ==
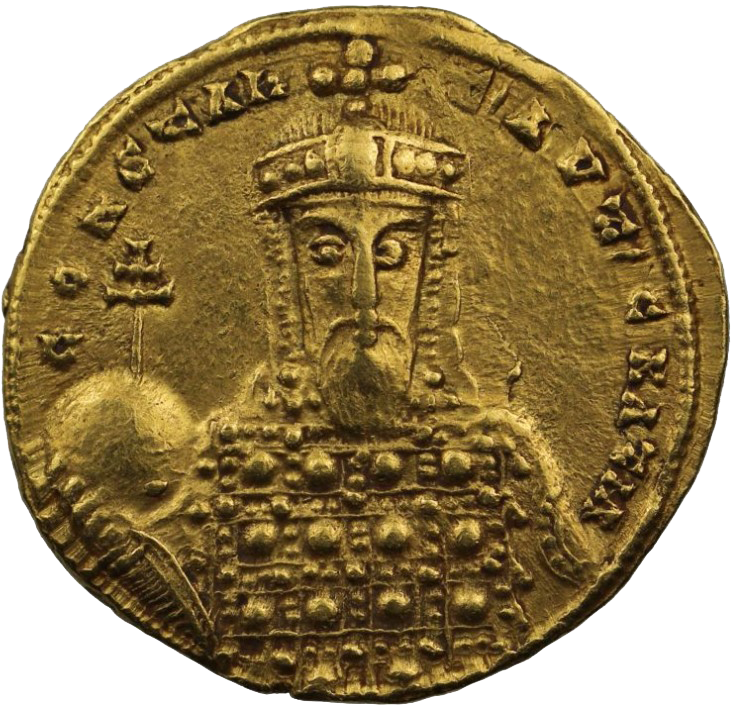
Solidus of Constantine VII.

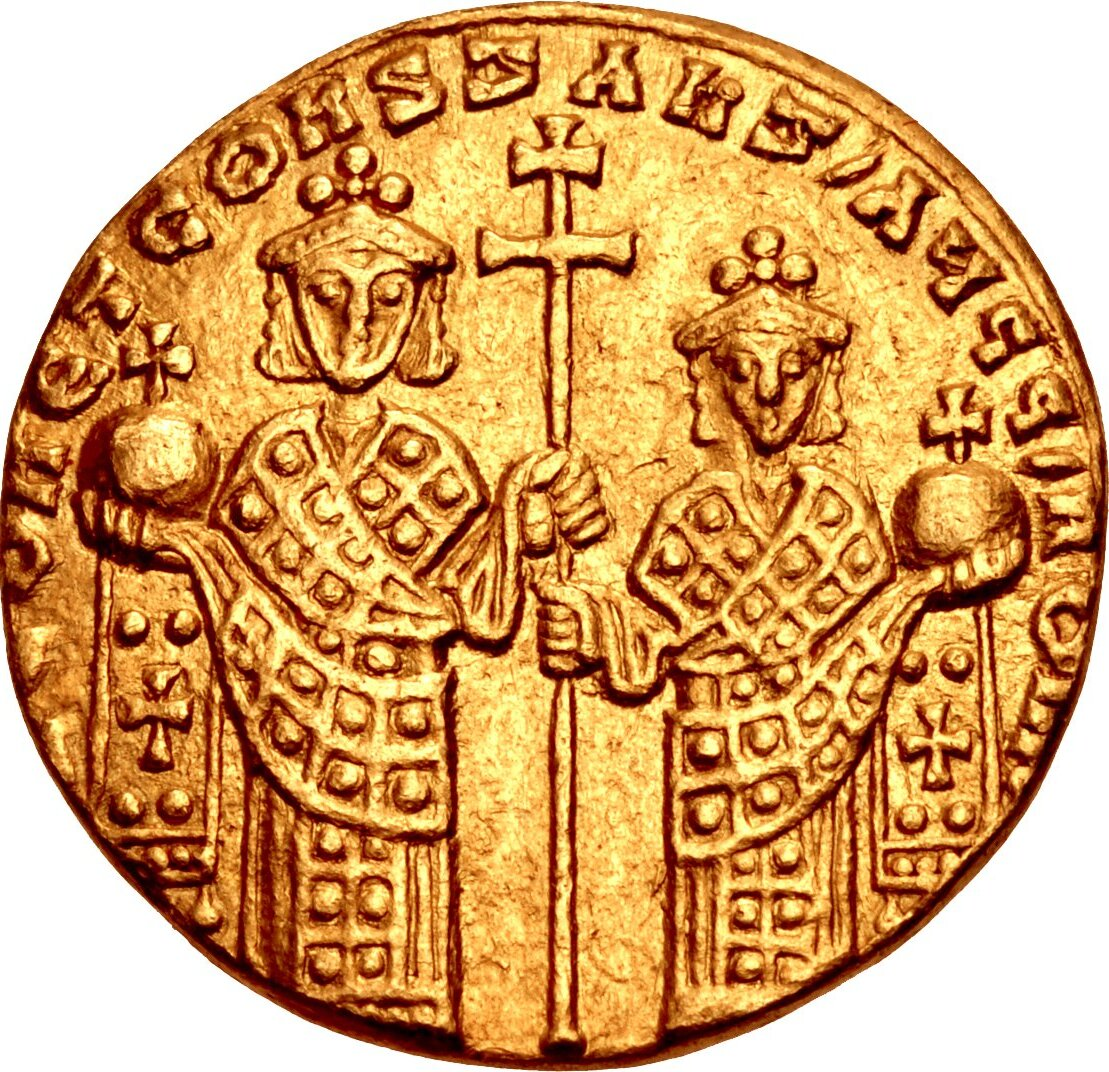
Gold solidus depicting Leo VI and Constantine VII, 908–913.

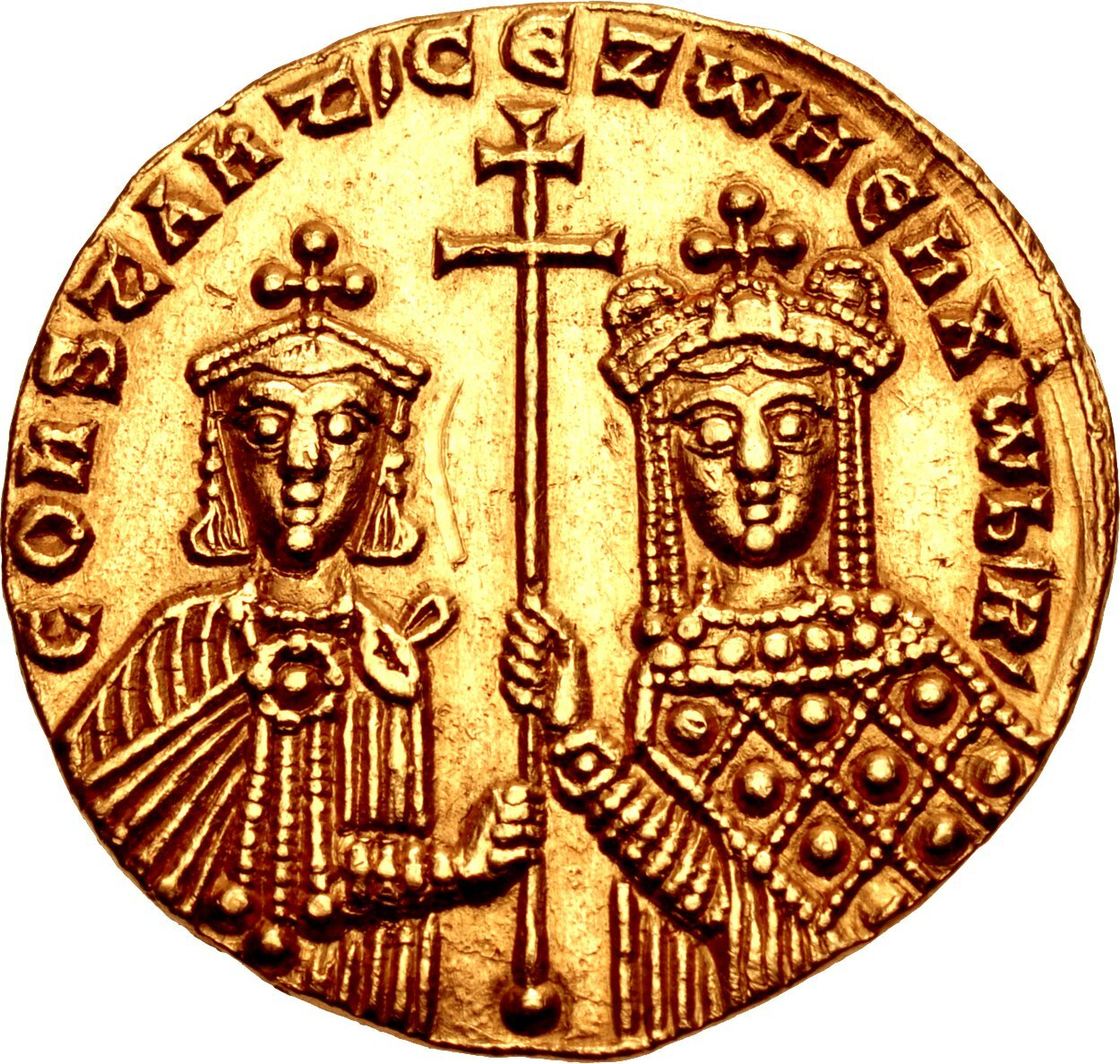
Zoe Karbonopsina and Constantine VII, 914–919.

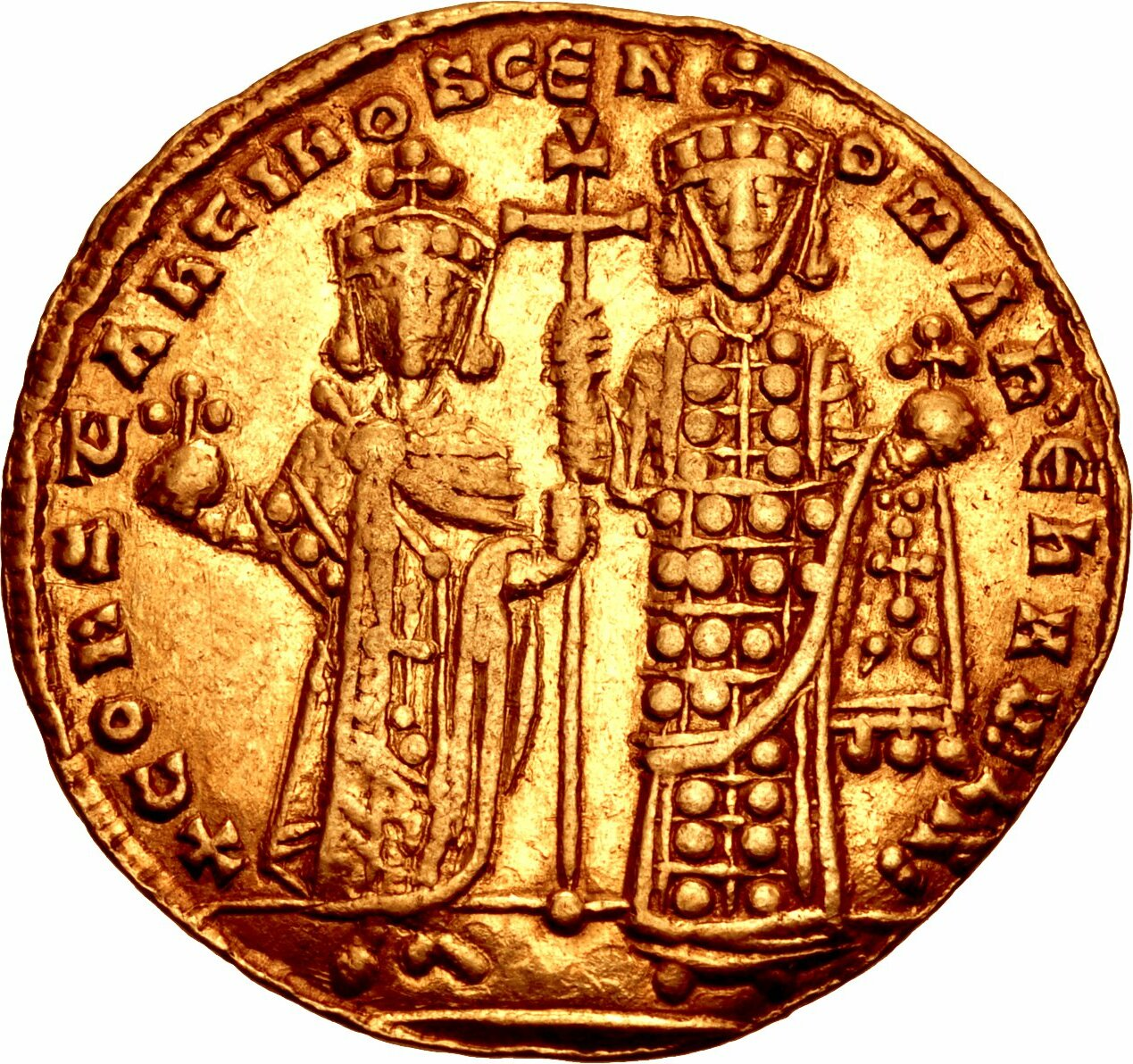
Romanos I Lekapenos and Constantine VII, 920–945.

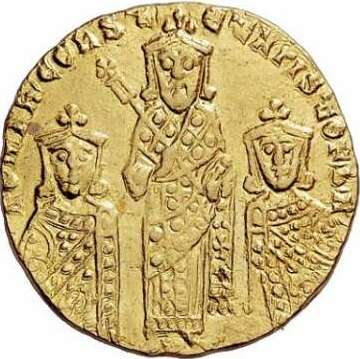
Romanos I with Constantine VII (Note: Or Constantine Lekapenos, or possibly both.) and Christopher, 921–931.

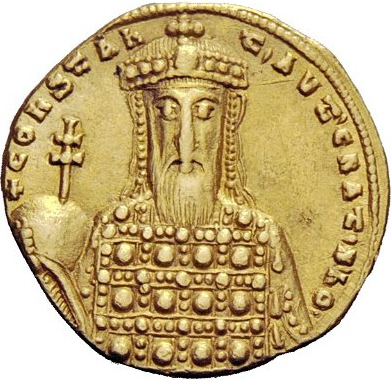
Constantine VII as sole emperor, 945–959.

== Sources ==
=== Primary ===
- Constantine VII, De ceremoniis, ed. J. Reiske (2 vols., 1829, 1830). English translation 'The Book of Ceremonies' accompanying the Greek text in 2 volumes by Ann Moffatt and Maxeme Tall, Canberra 2012 (Byzantina Australiensia 18).
- Constantine VII, 'Story of the Image of Edessa', tr. B. Slater, J. Jackson, in I. Wilson, The Turin Shroud (1978), pp. 235–251
- Constantine VII, Three treatises on Imperial military expeditions, ed. tr. J.F. Haldon (1990).

=== Modern books ===
- Cross, S. H.; Sherbowizt-Wetzor, O. P., eds. (1953). The Russian Primary Chronicle: Laurentian Text. Cambridge, MA: Medieval Academy of America. ISBN 9780915651320.
- Foss, Clive (2005). "Emperors named Constantine". Revue numismatique. 6 (161): 93–102. doi:10.3406/numi.2005.2594.
- Garland, Lynda (1999). Byzantine Empresses: Women and Power in Byzantium, AD 527–1204. Routledge.
- Kazhdan, Alexander, ed. (1991). "Constantine VII Porphyrogennetos". The Oxford Dictionary of Byzantium. Oxford University Press. pp. 502–503.
- Moravcsik, Gyula, ed. (1967) [1949]. Constantine Porphyrogenitus: De Administrando Imperio (2nd revised ed.). Washington D.C.: Dumbarton Oaks Center for Byzantine Studies. ISBN 9780884020219.
- Norwich, John Julius (1997). A Short History of Byzantium. London: Viking. ISBN 0-679-45088-2.
- Ostrogorsky, George (1956). History of the Byzantine State. Oxford: Basil Blackwell.
- Ostrogorsky, George (1969). History of the Byzantine State. New Brunswick, NJ: Rutgers University Press. ISBN 0-8135-0599-2.
- Runciman, Steven (1988) [1929]. The Emperor Romanus Lecapenus and His Reign: A Study of Tenth-Century Byzantium. Cambridge: Cambridge University Press. ISBN 9780521357227.
- Runciman, Steven (1930). A History of the First Bulgarian Empire. G. Bell & sons Ltd.
- Treadgold, Warren (1997). A History of the Byzantine State and Society. Stanford, California: Stanford University Press. ISBN 0-8047-2630-2.
- Lilie, Ralph-Johannes; et al. (2013). Prosopographie der mittelbyzantinischen Zeit (in German). doi:10.1515/pmbz.
- Logos, Aleksandar (2019a), "De administrando imperio: Time of creation and some corrections for translation", academia.edu
- Logos, Aleksandar (2019b). Istorija Srba 1 – Dopuna 4; Istorija Srba 5. Beograd: ATC. ISBN 978-86-85117-46-6.
- Moore, John Michael; Moore, P. (1965). The manuscript tradition of Polybius. Cambridge: Cambridge University Press. ISBN 978-0-521-05755-4.

=== Journals ===
- Grierson, P.; Jenkins, R. (1962). "The date of Constantine VII's coronation". Byzantion. 32 (1): 133–138. JSTOR 44169041.
- Grumel, Venance (1937). "Une date historico-liturgique". Revue des études byzantines. 36 (185).

Constantine VII Macedonian Dynasty Born: 18 May 905 Died: 9 November 959
Regnal titles
| Preceded by Alexander | Byzantine emperor 6 June 913 – 9 November 959 with Romanos I Lekapenos (920–944); Christopher Lekapenos (921–931); Stephen Lekapenos (924–945); Constantine Lekapenos (924–945) | Succeeded by Romanos II |
