= Nut Feast of the Saviour =

Orthodox Christian religious festival

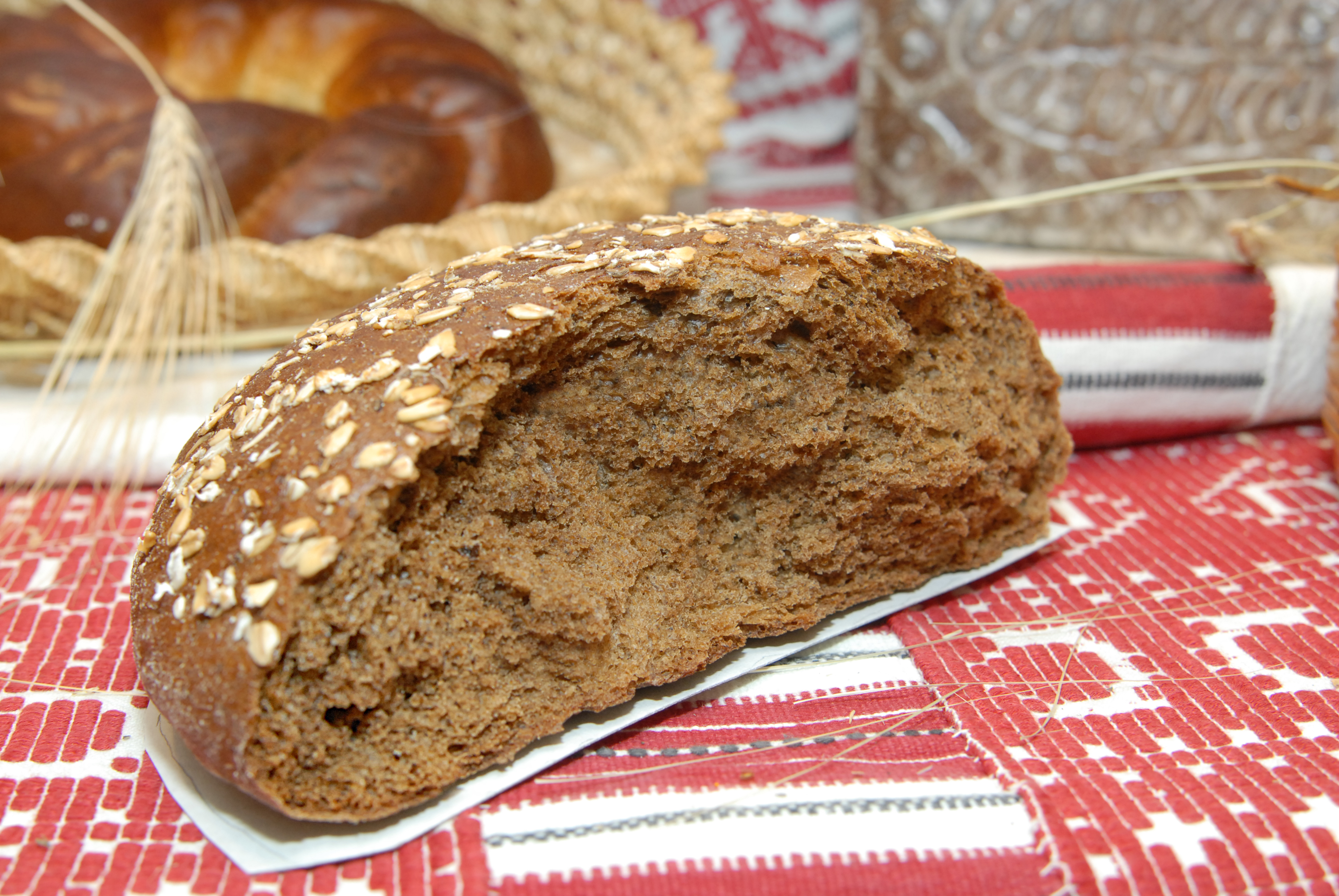
- Official name: Russian: Третий Спас; Ukrainian: Третій Спас
- Also called: Bread Feast of the Saviour
- Observed by: Slavic Orthodoxy
- Type: Religious
- Celebrations: processions, blessings of canvasses, new crops and new bread.
- Date: August 31 (Gregorian calendar); August 16 (Julian calendar)
- Frequency: Annual
- First time: 944; 1082 years ago
- Started by: Constantine VII
- Related to: Image of Edessa

The Nut Feast of the Saviour is the third Spas feast of the Saviour which celebrates the Holy Mandylion of the Lord. It is celebrated as the afterfeast of the solemnity of the Dormition. After the Honey Feast of the Saviour and the Apple Feast of the Saviour, the Nut feast is therefore placed on August 16 in the Julian calendar and on August 29 in the Gregorian calendar.

== Etymology ==
The third Spas are known as the Nut Feast of the Saviour because, in most places in central Russia, nuts ripened at the time of the year in late August when this festival is celebrated.

This festival is also referred to as the “Savior on Canvas”, “Savior on Canvas”, and “Canvas Spas” - from this day they sell homespun canvases; "Bread Spas" as it also matches the time when the harvesting of the wheat end and the first new bread is baked. It can also be called "Autumn Spas" when winter grains are sown.

== Liturgy ==
This liturgical afterfeast which is known technically as the feast of Our Saviour of the Mysterious Image is considered a "Small Spas" - or a semi-holiday - in contrast with the major feasts of Jesus Christ.

The tradition is to organize processions outside the church as well as special blessings on this occasion.

The liturgical ordo however is not connected to the popular feast but to the celebration of the Holy Mandylion which Vespers and Divine Liturgy.

== Origin ==
=== An agricultural autumn festival ===
On the third Savior, birds fly away, especially swallows and cranes. It is believed that swallows fly off at three Spas. If the crane flies off to the third Spas, then it will be frosty on Pokrov, the feast of the Intercession of the Theotokos. Vladimir Dal, in the interpretation of the farmer's calendar, compiled according to folk signs and observations, gives an original view: “Winter flask on trees promises, as they say, a good harvest for bread; a harvest of nuts promises a plentiful harvest of grain for the coming year, at least it has been observed that a strong harvest of nuts and bread is never together; that, moreover, there is never a great harvest of nuts for two years in a row; therefore, with an abundance of nuts, there will be no next year, and probably there will be a harvest for bread. Returning to the name of the third Savior, called “bread” or “nut”, the people celebrated it as a day of thanksgiving to the Lord for daily bread for every day, which is heard in folk proverbs and sayings: “The Third Savior has stored bread”, “It’s good if the Savior - on the canvas, and the bread is in the threshing floor!

However, the feast of Our Savior of the Mysterious Image was much less an agricultural feast than the two other minor Spas, so much so that when it was forbidden by the Soviet Union, believers knew little about it as it was not in any way associated with farming practice.

=== A historical commemoration: the lost image of Edessa ===
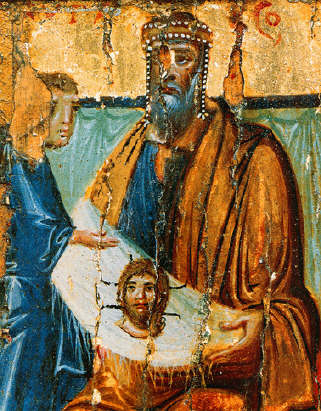
According to the account, King Abgar received the Image of Edessa, a likeness of Jesus.

On this day, the Slav Orthodox Christians also celebrate the translation of the Holy Mandylion. The image was considered an acheiropoieta icon "not made by the hand of man" similar to the Shroud of Turin, with which it is sometimes associated. Coming from Jerusalem, it was moved to Constantinople in the 10th century. During the Arab occupation of the city in 944, Emperor Constantine VII bought this image from the Emir and with great honors transferred to Constantinople, the Church of the Blessed Virgin.

This translation which was later interpreted as its "removal" is the historical event commemorated during the Nut Festival. The cloth disappeared when Constantinople was sacked in 1204 during the Fourth Crusade, and is believed by some to have reappeared as a relic in King Louis IX of France's Sainte-Chapelle in Paris. This relic disappeared in the French Revolution.

=== The Feast of Diomedes ===
On this day, Slav Orthodox Christians honor the physician and martyr Diomedes of Tarsus, who is prayed for with various ailments and illnesses.

This festival also honors the Feodorovskaya Icon of the Mother of God, before which women pray for a safe delivery.

== Traditions ==
=== An urban rather than a village tradition ===
In most villages in Russia, there were no big holidays on this day, as preparations began for the completion of summer field work before the onset of rains. In the cities from this day Velikodensky Carnival begins, as in Valdai for example.

In the steppe provinces of Russia, winter crops usually begin to be sown three days before Obzhynki and finished within three days after Obzhynki. On this day, bread is baked from the grain of the new crop. The dates were adjusted depending on the weather and harvesting of spring crops. Sometimes we dropped out earlier to the Apple Feast of the Saviour.

=== Harvesting of nuts ===
Harvesting of hazelnuts also began from the third Spas. Using holy water, a specific blessing of the nuts takes place during the celebration.

On this day, slavic households prepare festive dishes with nuts such as pies with mushrooms and dishes with nuts. Nut-based pastries are also prepared such as baked apples and sweets with nuts, as well as necessarily freshly baked bread using the new crops.

== Literature ==
After years of atheistic communism, renewing such popular religious feasts was part of recovering the soul of Holy Russia according to dissident authors such as Andrei Sinyavsky.

== See also ==
- Honey Feast of the Saviour
- Apple Feast of the Saviour

== Bibliography ==
- Атрошенко О. В. Русская народная хрононимия: системно-функциональный и лексикографический аспекты // Автореферат диссертации на соискание ученой степени кандидата филологических наук. Уральский федеральный университет. — Екатеринбург, 2013.
- Баранова О. Г., Зимина Т. А., Мадлевская Е. Л. и др. Русский праздник. Праздники и обряды народного земледельческого календаря. Иллюстрированная энциклопедия / Науч. ред. И. И. Шангина. — СПб.: Искусство-СПБ, 2001. — 668 с. — (История в зеркале быта). — ISBN 5-210-01497-5.
- Георгиева Т. С. Культура повседневности. Русская культура и православие : Учеб. пособие. — М.: Аспект Пресс, 2008. — 400 с. — ISBN 978-5-7567-0476-1.
- Даль В. И. О повѣрьях суевѣріях и предразсудках русскаго народа. — СПб.: Изд. М.О. Вольфа, 1880. — 148 с.
- Спасать // Толковый словарь живого великорусского языка : в 4 т. / авт.-сост. В. И. Даль. — 2-е изд. — СПб. : Типография М. О. Вольфа, 1880—1882. — Т. 3.
- Золотые правила народной культуры / О. В. Котович, И. И. Крук. — Мн.: Адукацыя i выхаванне, 2010. — 592 с. — 3000 экз. — ISBN 978-985-471-335-9.
- Колесо времени: традиции и современность / Янка Крук, Оксана Котович. — Мн.: Беларусь, 2003. — 350 с. — ISBN 985-01-0477-5.
- Лозка А. Ю. Беларускі народны каляндар (белор.). — Мн.: Полымя, 2002. — 238 с. — ISBN 985-07-0298-2. (белор.)
- Некрылова А. Ф. Круглый год. — М.: Правда, 1991. — 496 с. — ISBN 5-253-00598-6.
- Некрылова А. Ф. Русский традиционный календарь: на каждый день и для каждого дома. — СПб.: Азбука-классика, 2007. — 765 с. — ISBN 5-352-02140-8.
- Погодой год припоминается: русский народный земледельческий календарь / Б. Ховратович. — Красноярск: Красноярское книжное изд-во, 1994. — 206 с. — ISBN 5-7479-0447-7.
- Рожнова П. К. Радоница. Русский народный календарь: обряды, обычаи, травы, заговорные слова. — М.: Дружба народов, 1992. — 174 с. — ISBN 5-285-00135-8.
- Сахаров И. П. Сказания русского народа. Народный дневник. Праздники и обычаи. — СПб.: Издательство МГУ, 1885. — 245 с.
- Скуратівський В. Т. Святвечір : нариси-дослідження : у 2-х кн. — К.: Перлин, 1994. — 207 с. — (Українська пізнавальна б-ка «Земляни». Серія «Українці»). — ISBN 5-7707-3429-9. (укр.)
