= Honey Feast of the Saviour =

Orthodox Christian religious festival

Honey Feast of our Saviour
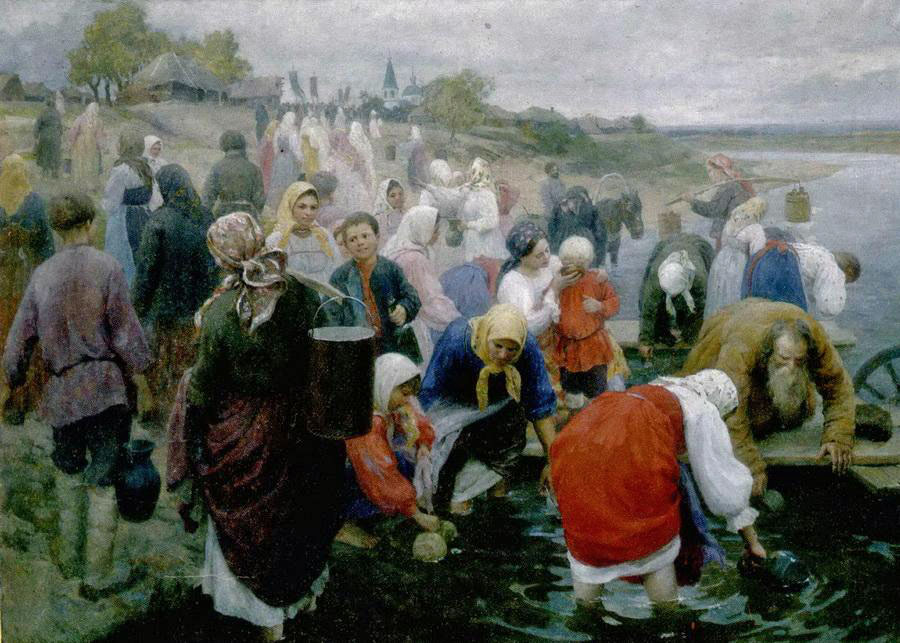
- Official name: Russian: Медовый Спас; Ukrainian: Маковія
- Observed by: Orthodox Church
- Liturgical color: Gold
- Type: Orthodox
- Date: August 1 (Ukraine); August 14 (O.S. August 1)
- Frequency: Annual
- First time: 1164
- Started by: Andrey Bogolyubsky
- Related to: Honey harvest Martyr of the Maccabees; Battle against the Bulgars in 1164

The Honey Feast of the Saviour or Wet Saviour known as the Honey Spas is the first day of a triduum in honor of the Jesus as Saviour, celebrated on August 1 in the Julian calendar (August 14 in the Gregorian calendar). It is followed by the Apple Feast on August 6, then the Nut Feast of the Saviour on August 16. On that day, Orthodox Churches honour the memory of three shrines: the Life-Giving Cross of the Lord; the image of the Saviour; and the icon of the Virgin of Vladimir. It is also the first day of the Dormition Fast. Customs include processions and water blessings at rivers, in which people and cattle then bathe, while wells are also consecrated.

== Etymology ==
It is believed that the name Spas was given in honour of Jesus Christ the Savior. According to N.V. Solodovnikova, the word Spas which translates as "saved" means "saving yourself".

Folk etymology on the other hand links the feast to the Papaver poppy, which ripens by this time.

== Liturgy ==
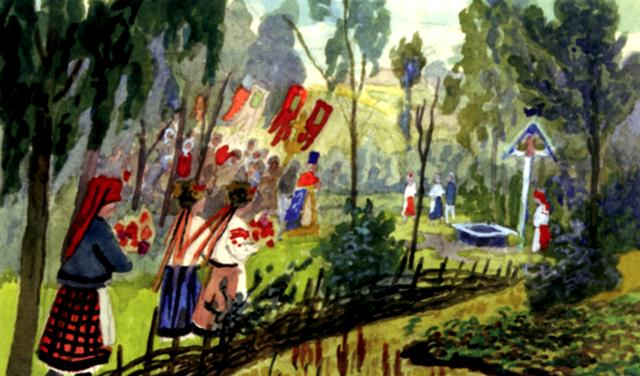
Painting by Ukrainian painter Yuriy Yuryevich Pavlovich of a procession to the Well on the Feast of Maccabees also known as the Honey Feast of the Lord.

It is traditionally believed that the two weeks of the Spas festival from the Honey Saviour to the Nut Saviour were 'cut off' by God from Great Lent. In fact, these three feasts are known as Second Spas in comparison with the First Spas which are the major feasts of Jesus Christ.

The divine liturgy is usually celebrated with pomp and circumstance and followed to a procession to the local well.

After the liturgical celebration, young people dance with the song “Oh, poppy on the mountain”, («Ой, на горе мак») with playful round dances, the girls showered the boys with poppy seeds: singing: “Poppies, poppies, poppies, golden heads!” («Маки, маки, маковицы, золотые головицы!»).

== Origin ==
=== An agricultural cycle ===
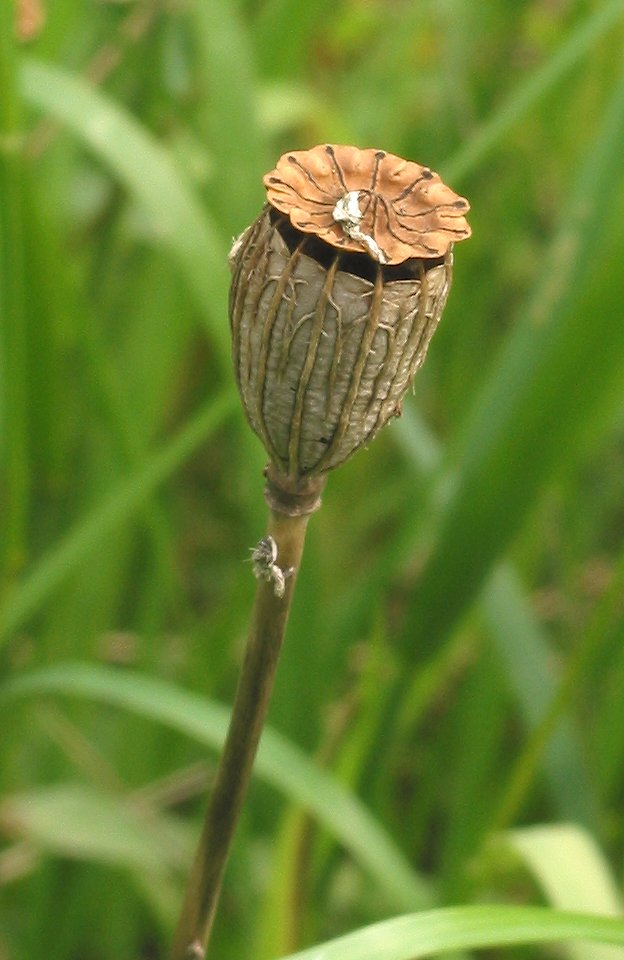
The Honey Saviour festival corresponds to an agricultural festival during which the Papaver rhoeas are ripe and the honey is harvested.

The holiday of the Honey Saviour has a pre-Christian origin and is associated with harvesting of honey.

The first Spas is called the Honey Saviour, because the honeycombs in the hives are usually already filled by this time, and the beekeepers begin to collect. It was believed that if the beekeeper did not break the honeycomb, then the neighboring bees would pull out all the honey. According to tradition, it was allowed to eat consecrated honey from that day.

The festival also corresponds to the time when sowing winter rye usually begins.

Sergei Tokarev relates these traditions with an ancient ritual of consecrating the first fruits of the earth to a pagan deity.

=== A biblical tradition: the martyr of the Maccabees ===
In the Orthodox tradition, this festival is also the liturgical celebration of the woman with seven sons who died as martyrs in 166 BC according to the Second Book of Maccabees.

=== A historical event: the battle of Andrei the Pious ===
The Honey Saviour Day was established following the recognition of miraculous signs during the battle of prince Andrey Bogolyubsky against the Volga Bulgars in 1164. According to tradition, ominous signs of victory came from icons of the Saviour and the Holy Virgin during this battle.

== Traditions ==
=== Digging wells ===
The feast of the Honey Saviour is associated with a water festival called the Lesser Blessing of the Waters, in contrast to the Great Blessing of the Waters on the feasts of Pascha and Theophany.

Traditionally in Russia, it was a time to consecrate new wells and clean old ones, with processions made to natural reservoirs and springs to bless these. After a procession, people and their livestock bathed in the consecrated water to wash away all diseases.

The Serbs of the Leskovac consider this time to be suitable for digging and cleaning wells.

=== Honeycomb crosses ===
During the festival, a special blessing is given to newly harvested honey. Honeycomb crosses are carved and carried in procession. In homes, the newly blessed honey is poured into painted cups known as gzhel. These are then placed in the centre of a table.

It is also traditional to feed honey to relatives, neighbours, and beggars. Blessed honey is also used to bake honey gingerbread, pies, buns, while the traditional drink for this holiday is sbiten, consisting of water, honey, and spicy herbs.

=== Poppy seed rolls ===
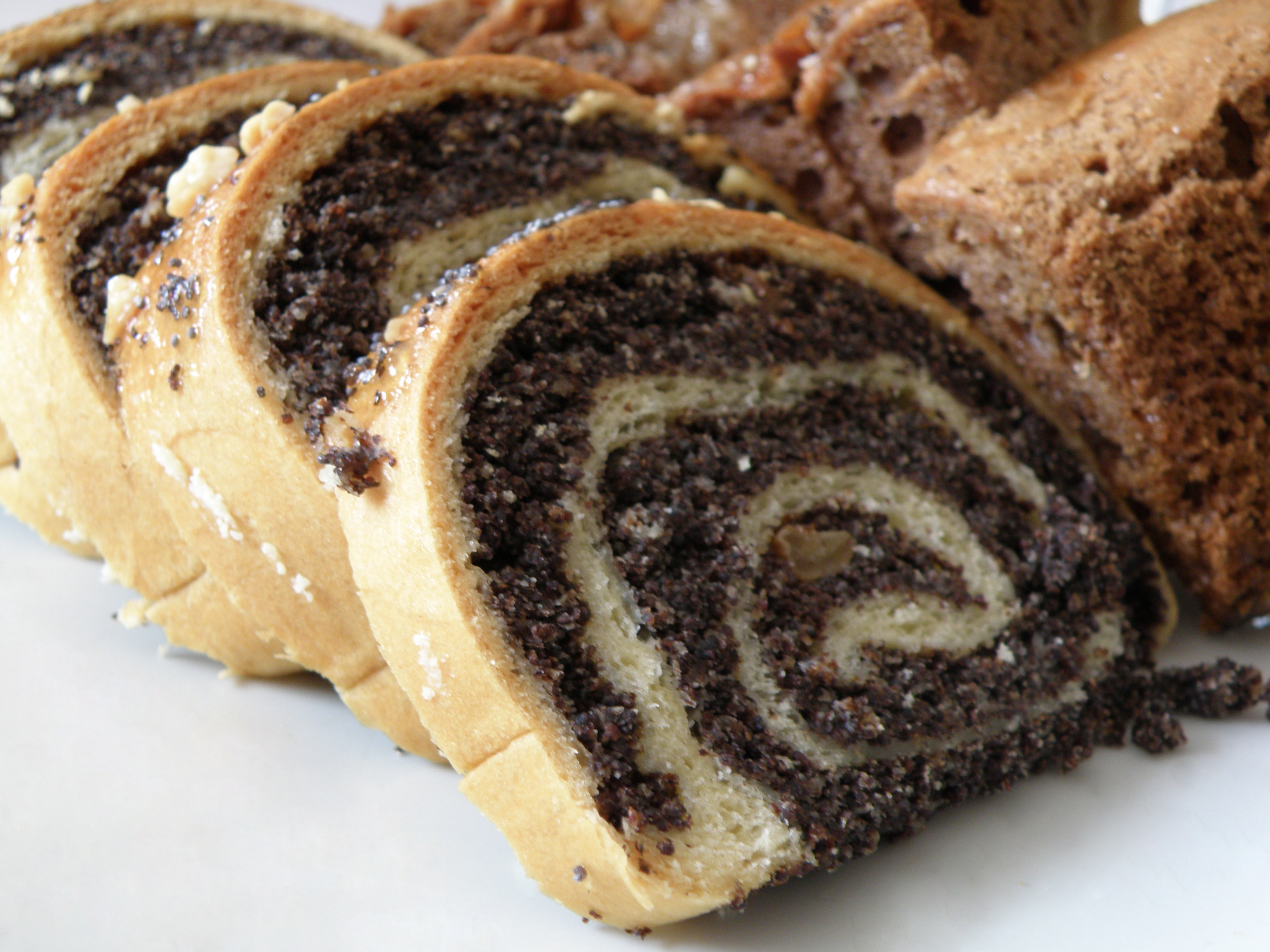
Poppy seed roll baked during the Festival.

On this day, the faithful also bake poppy seed rolls, eaten first at the festive meal.

Poppy milk is prepared for pancakes in a makitra with poppy-honey mass, in which pancakes are dipped. It is prepared in a special dish, called a makalnik in Russia, makitra in Ukraine, or makater in Belarus.

Poppy seed rolls are mentioned in many Russian proverbs, sayings, choral songs, and riddles: “A poppy seed roll with honey will make you will lick your mustache”, “When you eat the poppy, do not be angry”.

Blini and pryanik are also common fare during this festival.

== Related articles ==
- Lammas
