= Apple Feast of the Saviour =

Eastern Slavic folk feast name

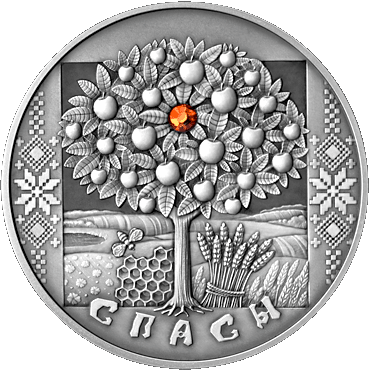
- Date: August 6 (Ukraine); August 19 (Belarus, Russia)
- Frequency: annual

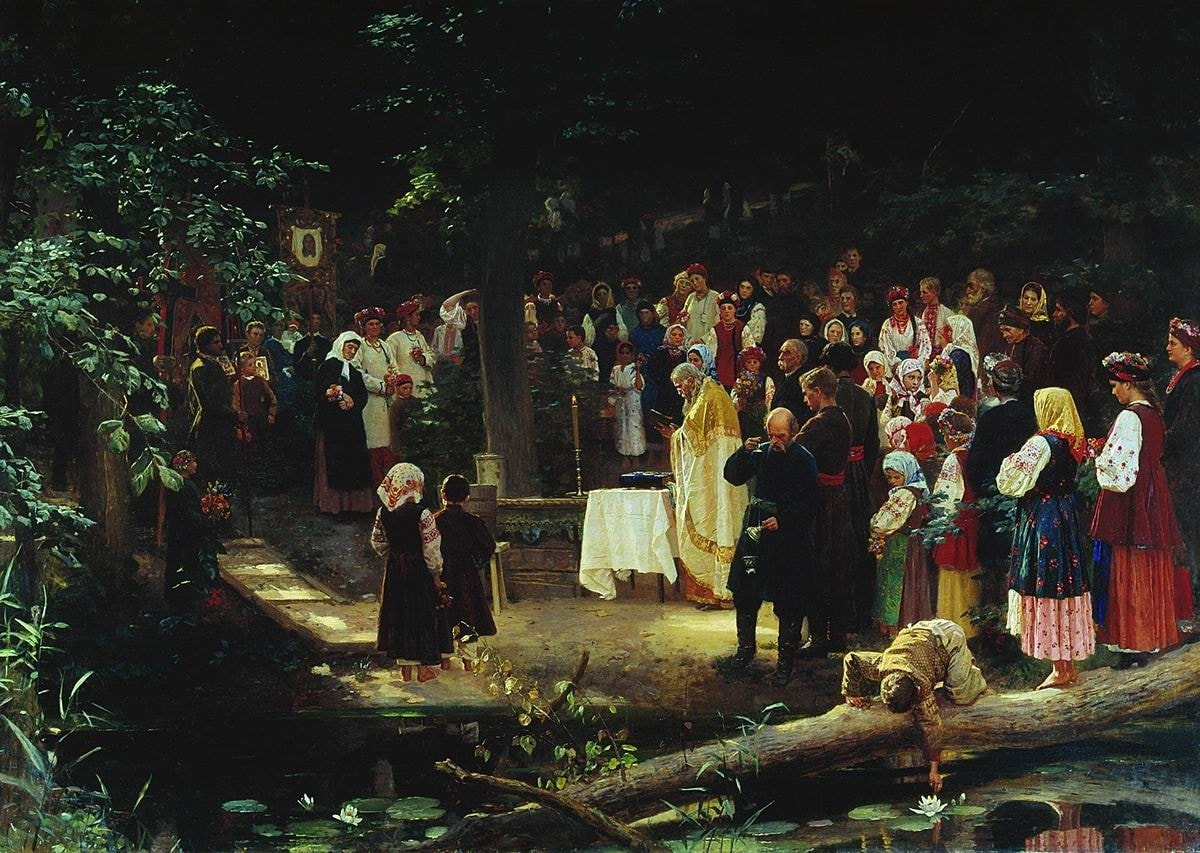
Nikolai Bodarevsky, Apple Feast of the Saviour in Little Russia

The Apple Feast of the Saviour or Apple Spas (sometimes the Feast of the Saviour on the Hill) is an Eastern Slavic folk name for the Feast of the Transfiguration, which is observed in August.

It is the second of the three Feasts of the Saviour. In Ukrainian language it is Я́блучний Спа́с (Yábluchnyi Spás), whereas in Russian it is Я́блочный Спа́с (Yáblochnyy Spás). This is one of three holidays in Orthodox Christianity on which food items are blessed at church and then consumed by the faithful rather than priests, akin to the First Fruits of Judaism. The others are the Honey Feast of the Saviour, which is celebrated on August 1 in Ukraine and August 14 (O.S. August 1) in Russia and Belarus and the Nut Feast of the Saviour, which is celebrated on August 16 in Ukraine and August 29 (O.S. August 16) in Russia and Belarus.

The holiday has a pre-Christian origin and is associated with harvesting of ripe fruits, especially apples. In East Slavic folklore, it marks the beginning of autumn and means the transfiguration of nature. In the Byzantine Empire there was tradition to bless harvested grapes during the Feast of the Transfiguration. In Russia apples are more common than grapes, hence the name of the feast. There are processions and blessings of harvests. Usually, on that holiday, people from Russia, Ukraine and Belarus eat apples, apple pies, or other dishes containing apples, even if they are not Orthodox Christians.

== Gallery ==
Blessing by Holy water of fruits during the celebration of the Feast of the Transfiguration in the Spas village (Kolomyia Raion) within the Ivano-Frankivsk region in Ukraine.

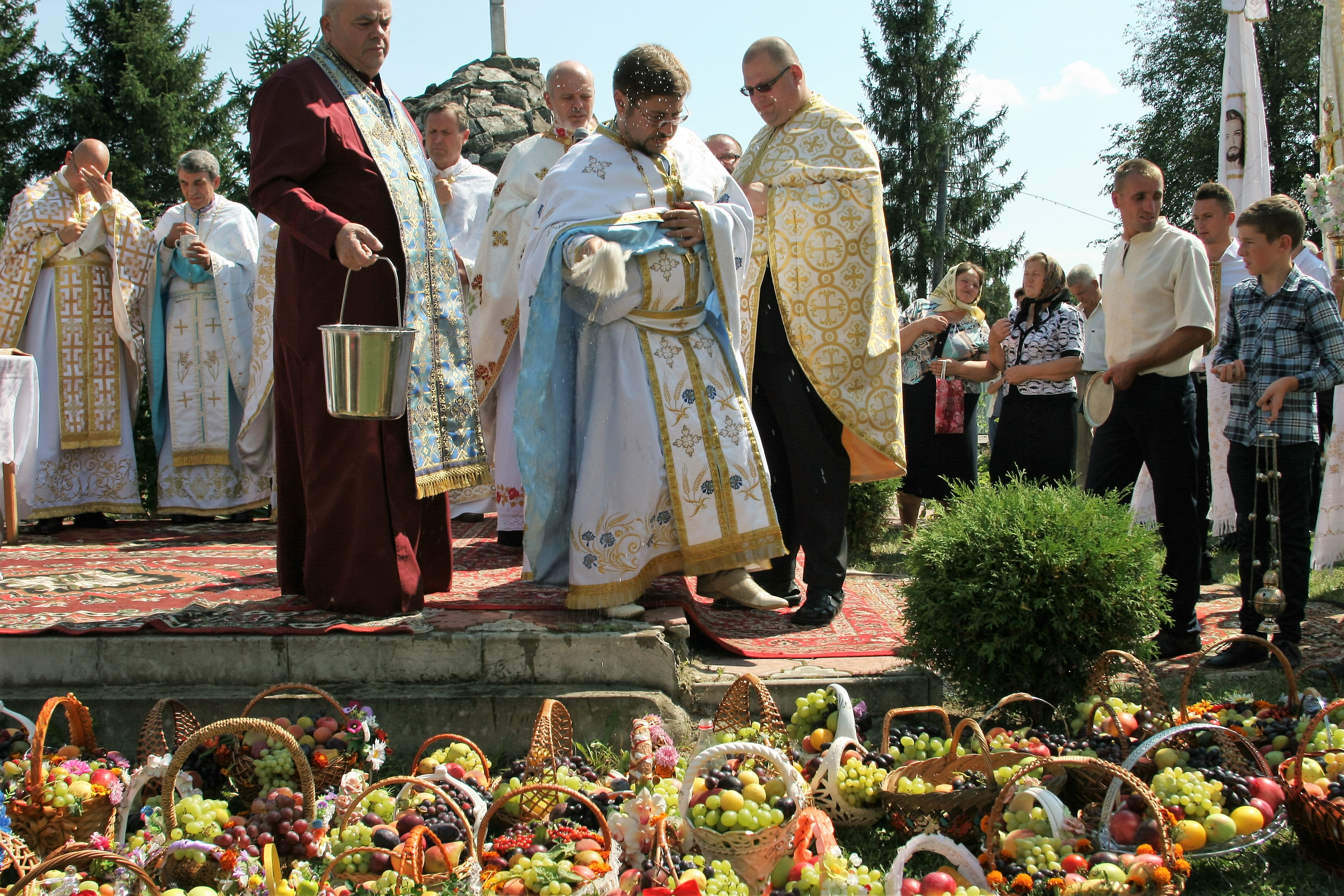

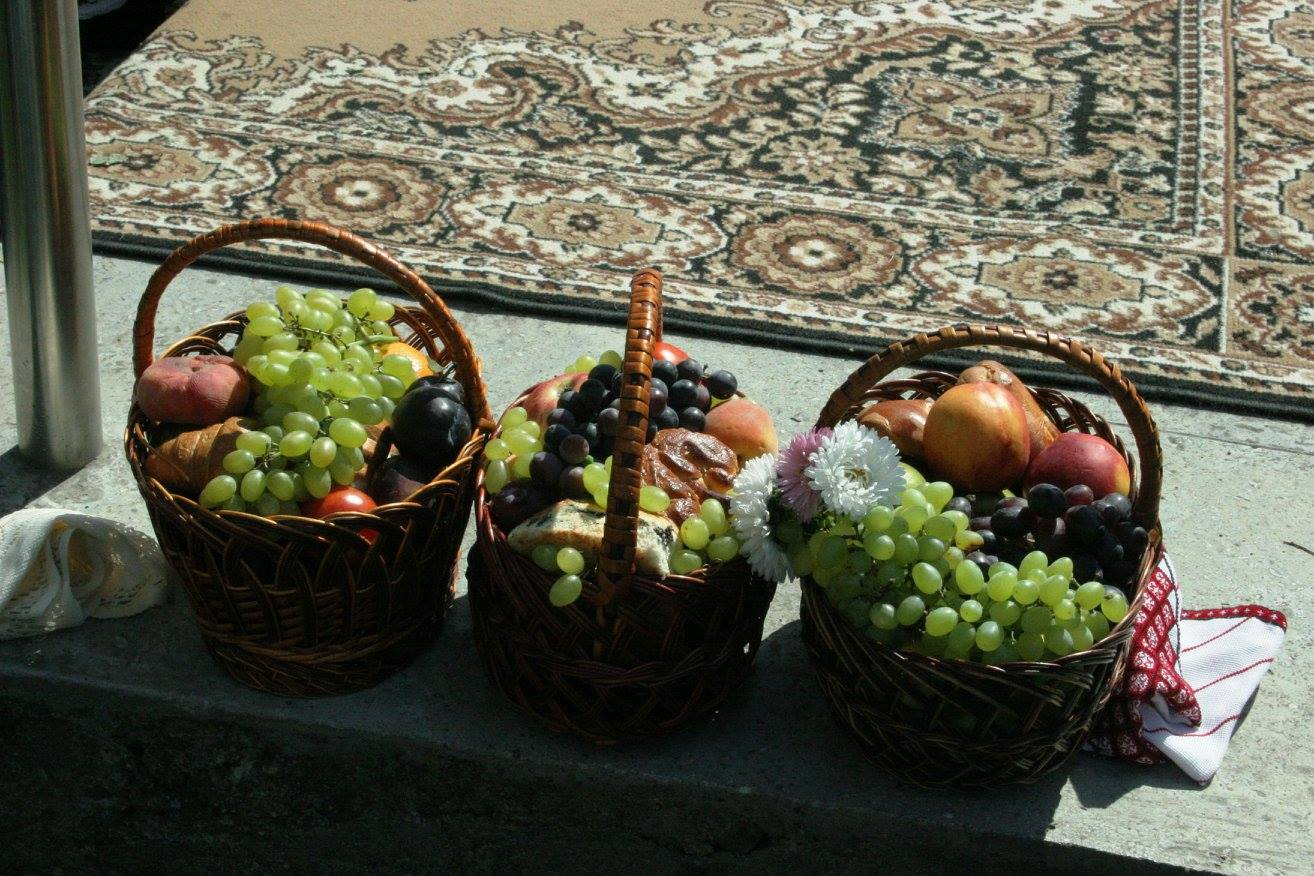

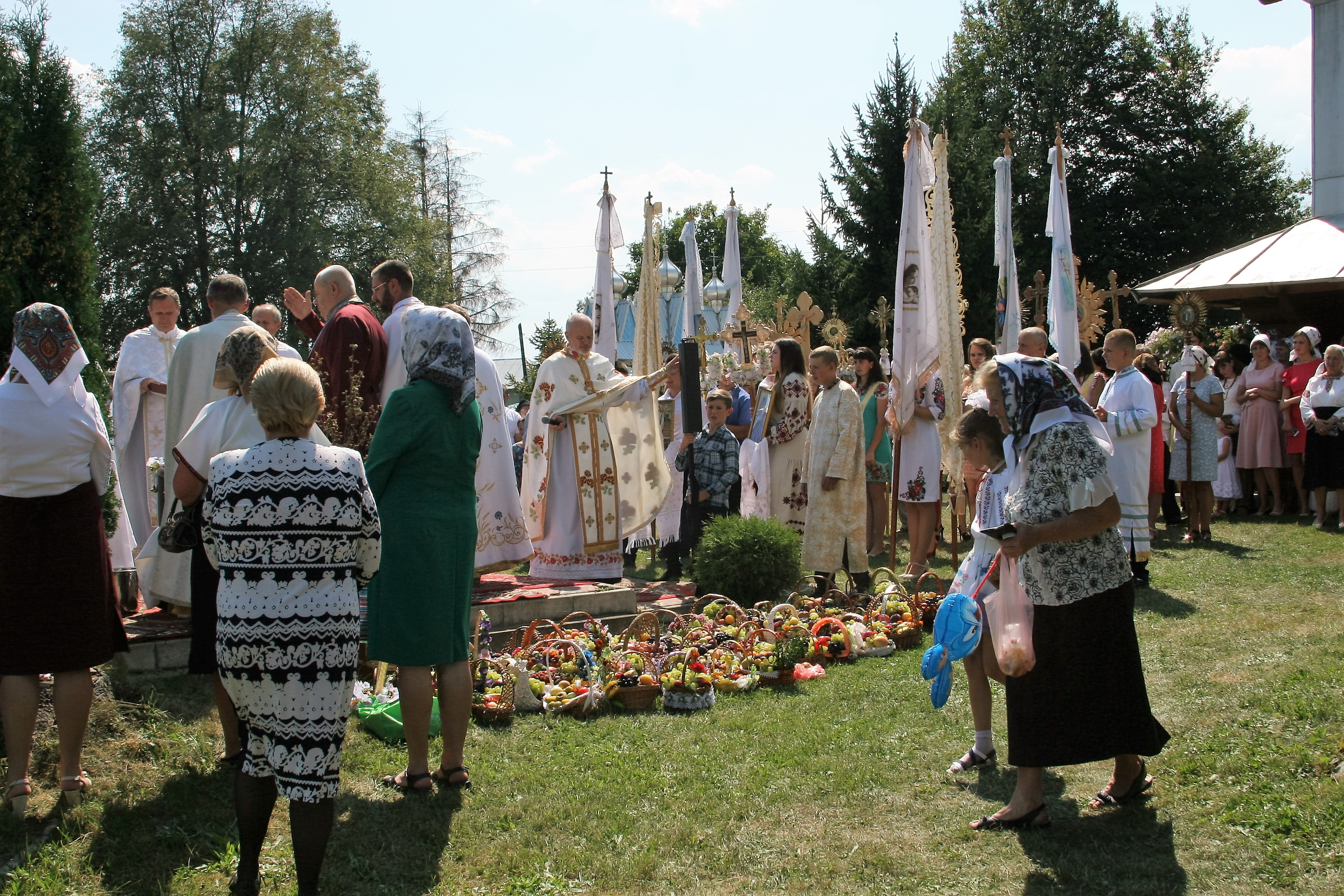
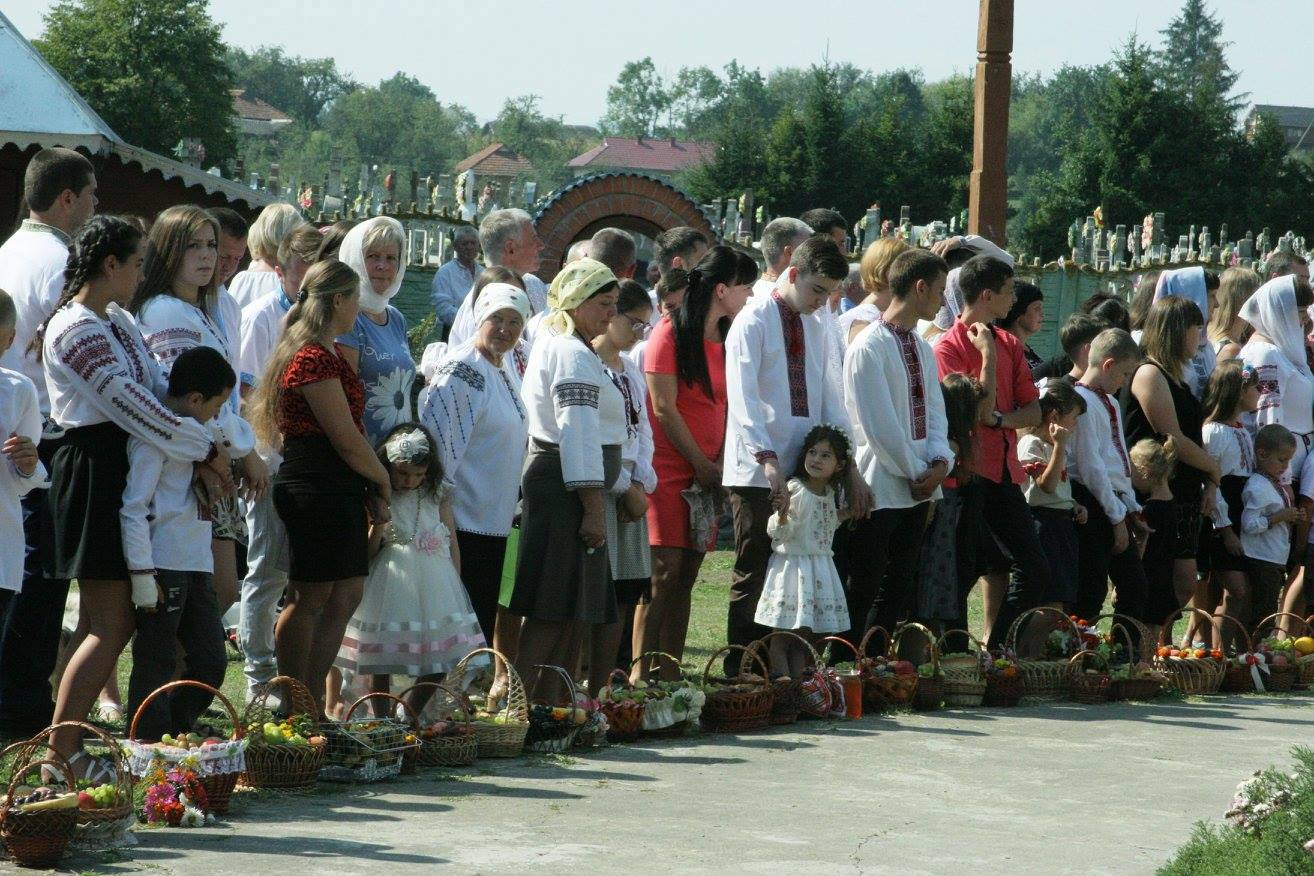

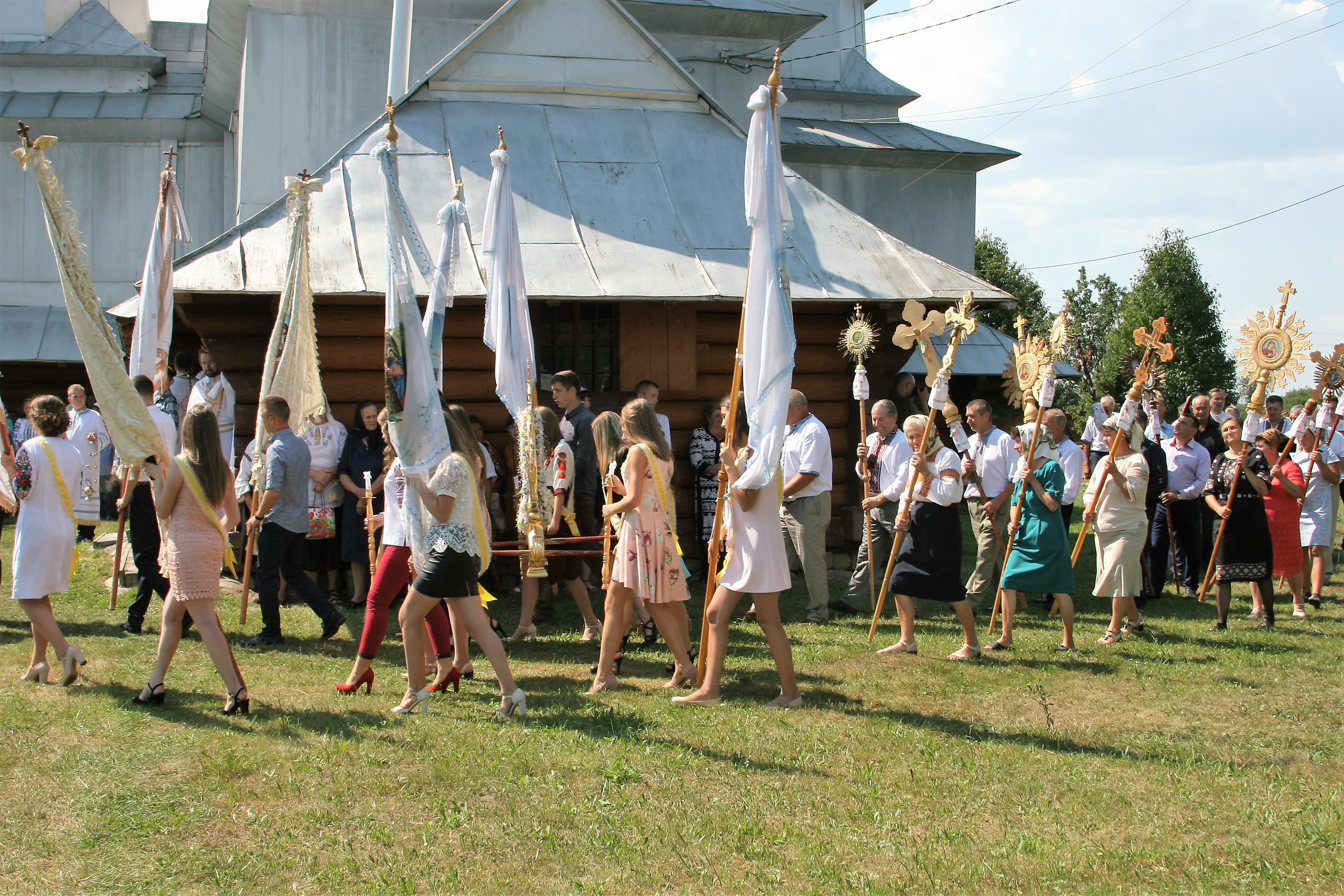

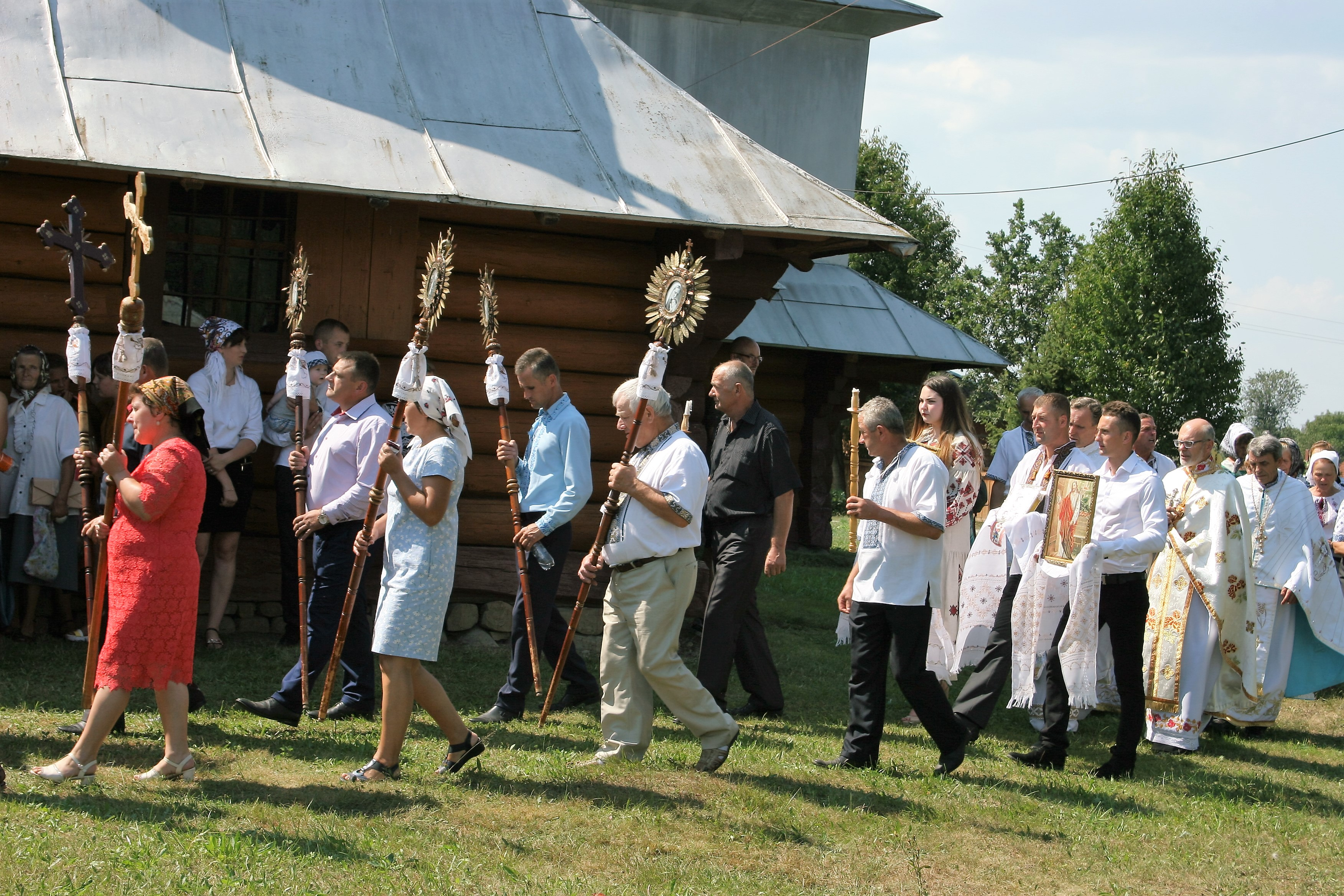
