= Intercession of the Theotokos =

Eastern Orthodox feast, October 1 (October 14 in Julian)

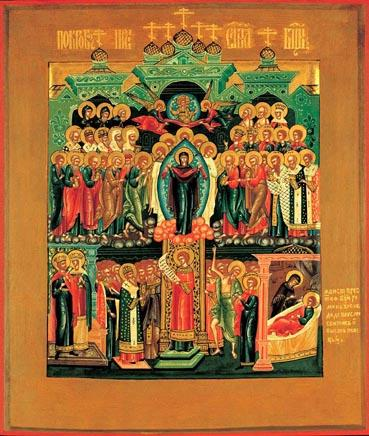
Icon of the Protection, 19th century, Russia

The Intercession of the Theotokos, or the Protection of Our Most Holy Lady Theotokos and Ever-Virgin Mary, is a Christian feast of the Mother of God celebrated in the Eastern Orthodox and Byzantine Catholic Churches on October 14 or October 1. The feast celebrates the protection afforded the faithful through the intercessions of the Theotokos (lit. Mother of God, one Eastern title of the Virgin Mary).

The feast is commemorated in Eastern Orthodoxy as a whole, but by no means as fervently as it is in Russia, Belarus, and Ukraine. In the Slavic Orthodox Churches it is celebrated as the most important solemnity besides the Twelve Great Feasts and Pascha. In Ukraine, it has a special meaning through its connection to the spirituality of the Ukrainian Cossacks and, accordingly and more recently, to Defenders of Ukraine Day.

== Etymology ==
The Protection of the Theotokos or the Intercession of the Theotokos (Church Slavonic: Покровъ, Pokrov, Russian: Покрова, Pokrova), like the (Greek: Σκέπη, Sképē) has a complex meaning. First of all, it refers to a cloak or shroud, but it also means protection or intercession. For this reason, the name of the feast is variously translated as the Veil of Our Lady, the Protecting Veil of the Theotokos. It is often translated as Feast of the Intercession or Feast of the Holy Protection.

With some reservations, the Intercession icon may be related to the Western Virgin of Mercy image, in which the Virgin spreads wide her cloak to cover and protect a group of kneeling supplicants (first known from Italy from about 1280).

== Tradition ==
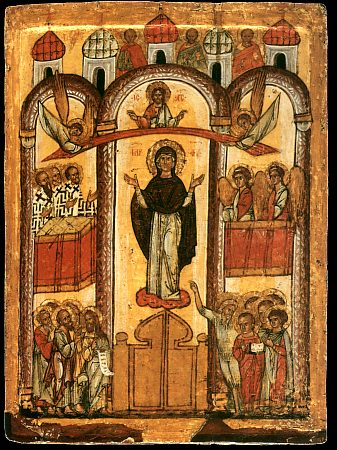
Russian icon of Pokrov

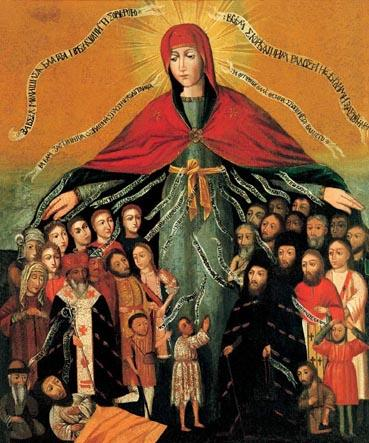
Icon showing a broad protective cloak. Mid-17th century, Ukraine.

According to Eastern Orthodox Sacred Tradition, the apparition of Mary the Theotokos occurred during the 10th century at the Blachernae church in Constantinople (modern-day Istanbul) where several of her relics (her robe, her veil, and part of her belt) were kept. On Sunday, October 1 at four in the morning, St. Andrew the Blessed Fool-for-Christ, who was a Slav by birth, saw the dome of the church open and the Virgin Mary enter, moving in the air above him, glowing and surrounded by angels and saints. She knelt and prayed with tears for all faithful Christians in the world. The Virgin Mary asked Her Son, Jesus Christ, to accept the prayers of all the people entreating Him and looking for Her protection. Once Her prayer was completed, She walked to the altar and continued to pray. Afterwards, She spread Her veil over all the people in the church as a protection.

St. Andrew turned to his disciple, St. Epiphanius, who was standing near him, and asked, "Do you see, brother, the Holy Theotokos, praying for all the world?" Epiphanius answered, "Yes, Holy Father, I see it and am amazed!"

According to the Primary Chronicle of St. Nestor the Chronicler, the inhabitants of Constantinople called upon the intercession of the Mother of God to protect them from an attack by a large Rus' army (Rus' was still pagan at the time). According to Nestor, the feast celebrates the destruction of this fleet sometime in the ninth century; according to some other legend, however, the outcome was the adoption of Christianity by the whole host (led by Askold).

Veneration of the Intercession (Pokrov) of Mary in Rus' (and consequently Belarus, Russia, and Ukraine) dates back to the 12th century.

== Icon ==
The icon of the feast, which is not found in Byzantine art, depicts in its upper part the Virgin Mary surrounded by a luminous aureole. She holds in her outstreched arms an orarion or veil, which symbolizes the protection of her intercession. To either side of her stand numerous saints and angels, many of whom are recognizable to the experienced church-goer: the apostles, John the Baptist, Saint Nicholas of Myra, etc. Below, St. Andrew the Fool for Christ is depicted, pointing up at the Virgin Mary and turning to his disciple Epiphanius. Usually, the veil with which the Virgin protects mankind is small and held either in her outstretched hands or by two angels, though a version similar to the Western European Virgin of Mercy image, with a larger cloak covering people is found in some Eastern Orthodox icons.

== Feast ==
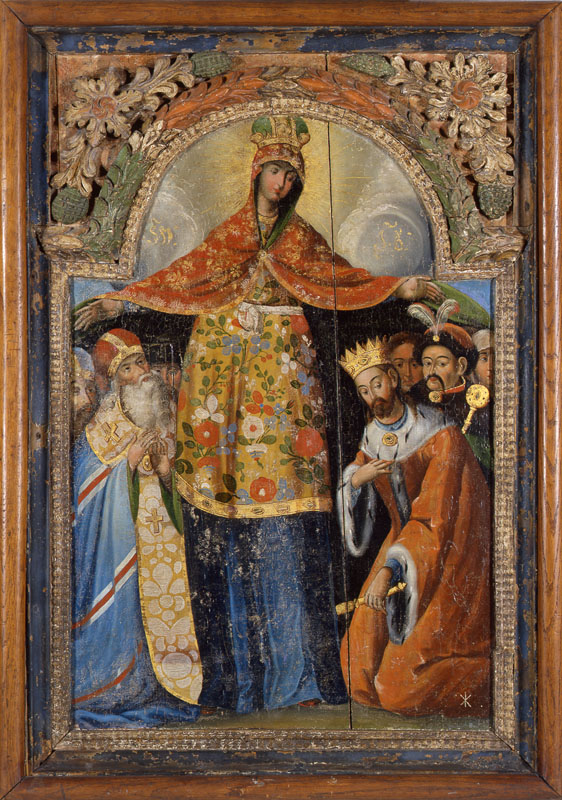
The Holy Virgin protecting the Ukrainian cossack hetman Bohdan Khmelnytsky (at the right of image). Late 17 to early 18th century, Ukraine.

The Feast of the Intercession commemorates the miracle as a joyous revelation of the Theotokos' protection, which is spread over the world, and the Mother of God's great love for mankind. It is a religious holy day or feast day of the Byzantine Rite Eastern Orthodox Churches. It is served as an All-Night Vigil, with many of the same elements as occur on Great Feasts of the Theotokos. However, Pokrov/Pokrova has no Afterfeast.

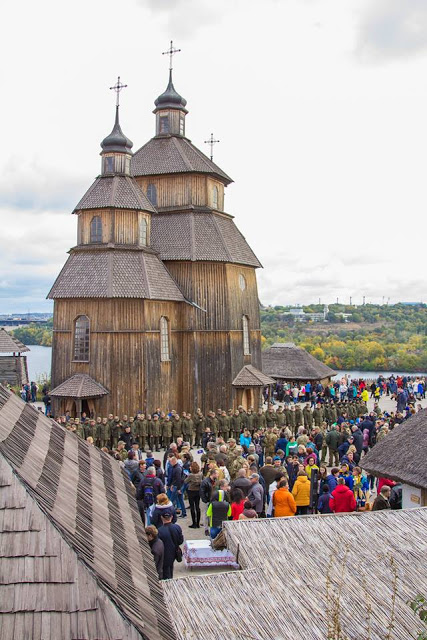
Sich Pokrova Church on Khortytsia

In Ukraine, it is celebrated on October 1 (before 2023: October 14) as a religious, national, and family holiday. The concept of Mother of God as the Intercessor and Protectress (i.e. the Intercession, or 'Pokrova' in Ukrainian, as an aspect of Virgin Mary) became firmly established among Ukrainians through their history. The Holy Lady of Protection was always considered the heavenly patroness of Zaporozhian Host, and therefore Ukrainian Cossacks. As a legend has it, each of their campaign the Cossacks began with Sub tuum praesidium prayer to the Holy Lady (in Ukrainian: «Під Твою милість прибігаємо, Богородице Діво, молитвами нашими в скорботах не погордуй, але від бід ізбав нас, єдина чиста і благословенна!»), by which making reference to the Intercession. Notably, an icon in the National Art Museum of Ukraine shows the Virgin Mary protecting the Ukrainian cossack hetman Bohdan Khmelnytsky. The singular (as compared to the rest of the Christian world) devotion of Ukrainians to the Intercession feast (for them being the third important, after Easter and Christmas, holiday) was acknowledged in Pylyp Orlyk Constitution, where Christmas, Easter and 'Pokrova' were set to be the three designated annual days of convention by the supreme cossack council that was supposed to rule the country. The tradition was referred to again in the 20th century, when the founding of the Ukrainian Insurgent Army was attributed (although retrospectively and probably inaccurately) to October 14, 1942. In 1990s, along with its religious meaning, the Pokrova Feast Day was also commemorated popularly as Ukrainian Cossack Day (Ukrainian: День Українського козацтва); then officially promulgated as such by decree of the Ukrainian President in 1999. Finally, on October 14, 2014, another President decree (approved by the Ukrainian parliament on March 5, 2015) promoted the day to the new public holiday "Defenders of Ukraine Day" (Ukrainian: День захи́сника́ Украї́ни, romanized: Den zakhysnyka Ukrainy), to replace the former "Defender of the Fatherland Day" inherited from the Soviet Union. The Lady of Intercession is regarded as a holy defender of both the Ukrainian nation at large and of the Armed Forces of Ukraine.

Some, but not all, regions of the Russian Federation celebrate the Feast of Intercession as a work holiday.

It is not a part of the ritual traditions of, and therefore is not celebrated by, the Oriental Orthodox Churches or some jurisdictions that allow Western Rite Orthodoxy. Yet the feast is perfectly consistent with the theology of these sister churches. The Western Rite Communities of the Russian Orthodox Church Outside of Russia (ROCOR) do celebrate this feast on their calendar.

October 1 (in the Julian calendar) is also the feast of St. Romanus the Melodist, so he is often depicted on the same icon, even though he and St. Andrew lived at different times. He is often shown directly below the Virgin Mary, standing on a bema, or on a kathedra, chanting from a scroll. The scroll represents the various kontakia which have been attributed to him.

The feast day of St. Andrew, the Fool-for-Christ, falls on the following day, October 2 (in accordance with the Orthodox liturgical tradition of the Synaxis).

== Namesake churches ==
Churches with that name are numerous in the East Slavic Orthodoxy.

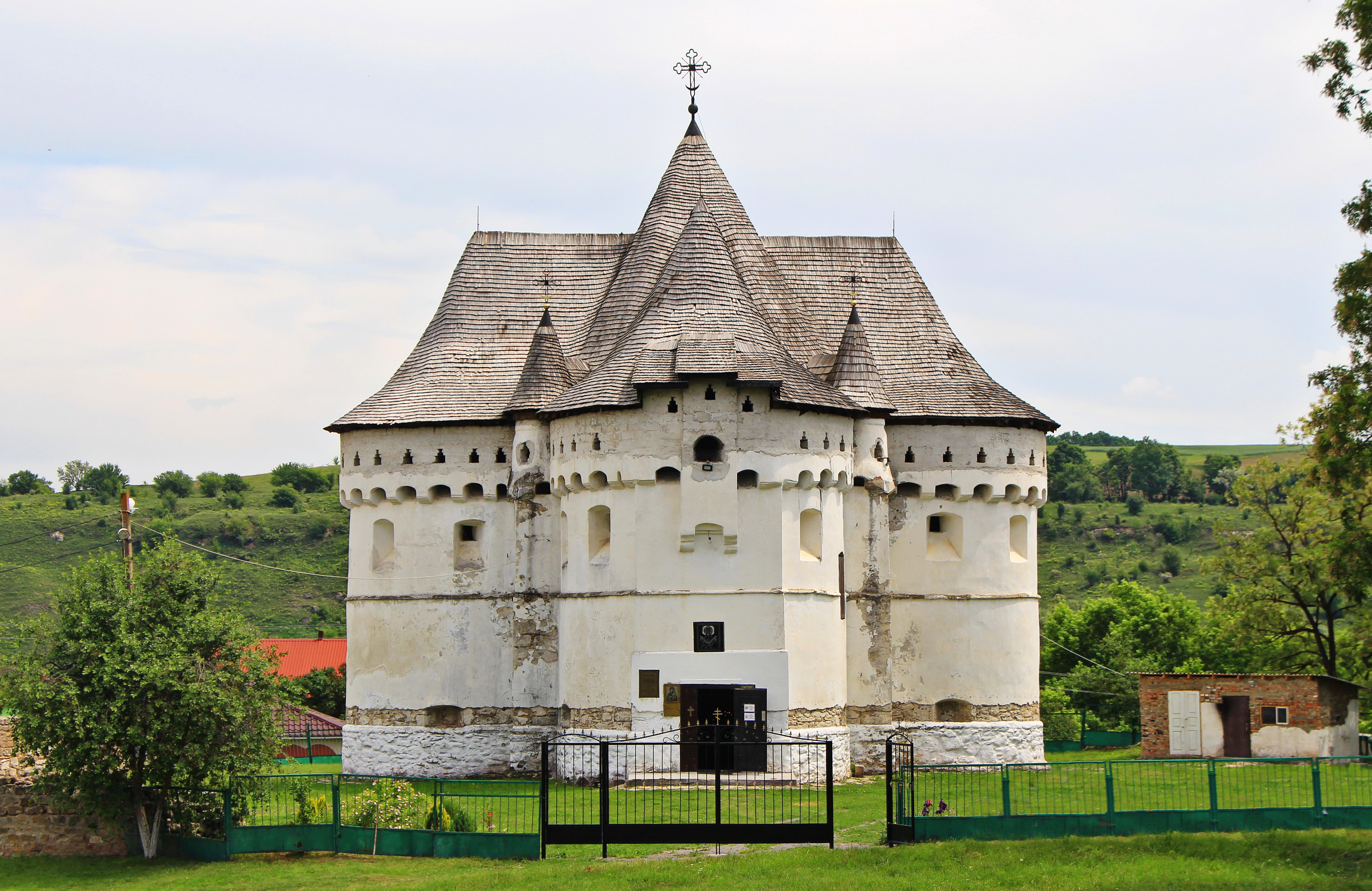
Intercession Church in Sutkivtsi

In Ukraine, the oldest church dedicated to Pokrova is considered to be the Holy Intercession Church in Sutkivtsi, built in 1476 to also serve as a fortress. The timber Sich Pokrova Church on Khortytsia island nowadays is a stylization for the church thought to have existed there since 1576. Other notable examples include Intercession Monastery Cathedral in Kharkiv, Svyato-Pokrovska Church in Podil, Kyiv, Pokrova Cathedral in Okhtyrka, all or them built in the Cossack Baroque style, and Svyato-Pokrovska Church in Plishyvets, in Neo-Baroque.

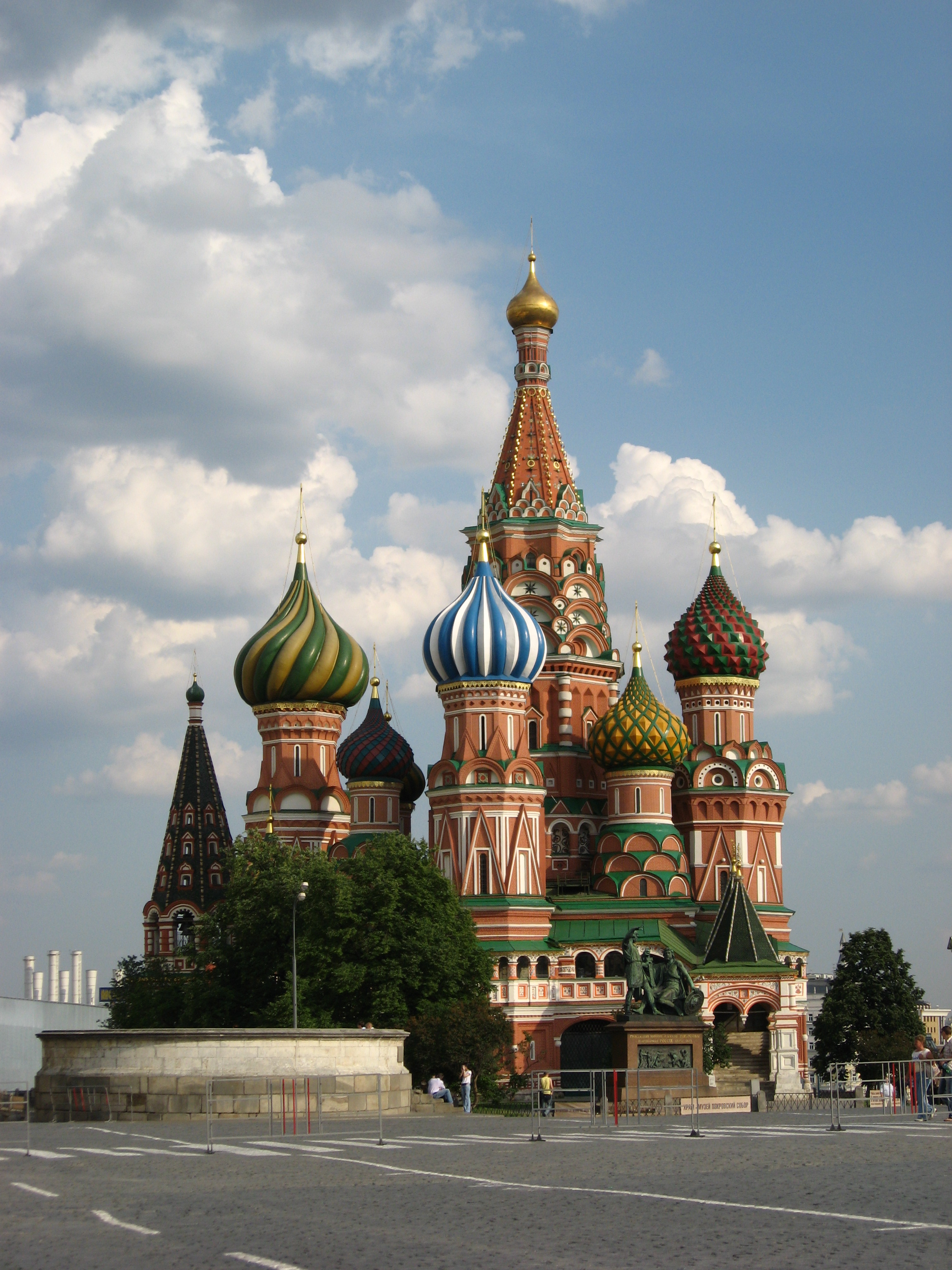
Pokrov Cathedral on the Moat, better known as Saint Basil's Cathedral

Probably the most famous Russian church named for Pokrov is Saint Basil's Cathedral, Red Square, Moscow, which is officially entitled "the Church of Intercession of Our Lady that Is on the Moat" (Russian: Собор Покрова пресвятой Богородицы, что на Рву) or shortly "Intercession Cathedral upon moat" (Russian: Храм Покрова "на рву"). The other one is the Church of Intercession in Bogolyubovo near Vladimir on the Nerl River (Russian: Церковь Покрова на Нерли, romanized: Tserkov Pokrova na Nerli). Both churches are on the United Nations' World Heritage List, the latter as part of the site White Monuments of Vladimir and Suzdal. There is also a Church of the Intercession of the Holy Virgin in St. Petersburg.

Other notable churches commemorating this feast are Intercession of the Holy Virgin Russian Orthodox Church in Manchester, England, and the Russian Orthodox Church of the Intercession of the Holy Virgin & St. Sergius in Glen Cove, New York.

In north Wales there is the Church of the Holy Protection (Eglwys yr Amddiffyniad Sanctaidd) at 10 Manod Road, Blaenau Ffestiniog, where the liturgy is celebrated partly in Welsh, also English, Greek, and Church Slavonic. The church, under Igoumen Deiniol, is under the omophor of the diocese of Sourozh of the Moscow Patriarchate.

== See also ==
- Blachernitissa
- Western Mater Misericordia imagery
- The Protecting Veil, a musical work by John Tavener, inspired by the Orthodox feast

== Bibliography ==
- Покров Пресвятой Богородицы (in Russian) The article was used for iconography description.
- Basil Lourié. The Feast of Pokrov, its Byzantine Origin, and the Cult of Gregory the Illuminator and Isaac the Parthian (Sahak Part^{c}ev) in Byzantium
