= Apocalypse of Anastasia =

The Apocalypse of Anastasia (abbreviated as "ApAnas.") is a medieval apocalyptic text pertaining to the nun Anastasia, and her near-death experience. Anastasia explores the "otherworld" with the Archangel Michael in her time of being dead for three days, and after her resurrection, she explains the marvelous and terrible things she had encountered. The text was originally written in Greek by an anonymous author and is dated either to the early tenth century or the early eleventh century. The genre of the text is that of touring Hell, and Anastasia's experience similarly follows famous biblical figures whose Apocalypses survived: Enoch, Baruch ben Neriah, Paul the Apostle, Saint Peter, and Mary, mother of Jesus.

== About Anastasia ==
The text purports Anastasia and her visions in the sixth century, but the text is dated to the tenth century in the reign of Basil II. A tenth-century authorship is textual supported as Nikephoros II is depicted in Hades confronting his killer John I Tzimiskes. Anastasia is a typological figure and is depicted as a modest nun. The author does not identify her with any saint. Anastasia's name is feminine and means resurrection, implying that she dies but will rise again in three days; And unlike renown rabbinic, ecclesiastical, or biblical heroes who've experienced a walkthrough in Hell and whose very identify would establish the legitimacy of a vision, the Apocalypse of Anastasia and its fictitious allegorical heroine is the first and last the Eastern Orthodox Church will use. Anastasia is also the first protagonist to actually enter the otherworld dead in the genre of Apocalyptic texts. She is not Anastasia of Sirmium, yet they were often confused with the other; and in the late tenth century, Anastasia of Sirmium had a strong cult-following. The church of Anastasia was used as a lunatic asylum in the late tenth century. Anastasia of Sirmium herself appears in her church as depicted in the first vision of Andrew the Fool of the Life of Andrew the Fool which lead him to become a fool for Christ at the start of the first four months he spent in chains.

== Narrative overview ==
Unlike most traditional apocalyptic texts that focus on eschatology, the Apocalypse of Anastasia focuses on what is beyond the ending of the material world; the transmission process of revelations and the process of divine intercessory assistance. Taken to the heavens by Michael, Anastasia describes a blinding light from afar which she sees through, the throne of God surrounded by Biblical features and figures. At the same vantage point and without interaction, she not only sees the seven gates of heaven, but also describes what is beyond the gates. The text though gives no description for Gates five and six. The first gate contains the sources for hail which are immense pools; the second, bitter rain; the third, the Jordan River; and the fourth, salvation and the source for whether phenomenon, immense birds filtering waters of the firmament and the sun's rays to selected degrees which could cause rain, sunshine, drought, or flooding, all at the command of Elijah; the seventh gate, a passageway that leads to punishment areas. Anastasia is then taken back to the throne only to witness an accusation and intercession scene but is taken by the angel to the main punishment area which consists of wells, ovens, foaming, and fiery rivers. She is taken up to Paradise which had a garden of fruit trees with a banquet table and a chamber of hanging lights. Above Paradise, an angelic bureau where the good deeds and sins of humanity are written by the angelic scribes in large books, and the voice of God being conversed with angelic entities. An extreme punishing area is then shown to Anastasia where the emperors, priest, bishops, and other high officials go. Anastasia returns to the living, and the text is concluded with moral exhortations and doxology.

== Transliteration ==
Constantinople was in a state of renewal and reconstruction from the second half of the ninth century to the end of the tenth century. Old manuscripts of ancient texts were being surveyed and collected in a campaign commissioned usually by imperil authority. In the process of transliteration, many manuscripts of old uncial were converted to minuscule. This process allowed extensive content to be copied and recopied more efficiently. Transliteration can be viewed on the parchment of the oldest manuscript of the Apocalypse of Anastasia dated to 1340. Palimpsest, the folios of Bodleian Selden Supra 9 was compiled from four earlier manuscripts which consisted of two-tenth century liturgical works, an Old Testament lectionary dated near the turn of the eleventh century which the Apocalypse of Anastasia appears on top, and a ninth century New Testament lectionary.

== Bibliography ==
- Bardakjian, Kevork; La Porta, Sergio (2014). The Armenian Apocalyptic Tradition: A Comparative Perspective. BRILL. ISBN 9789004270268.
- Baumgartner, Albert I. (2000). Apocalyptic Time. BRILL. ISBN 9789047400561.
- Gerolemou, Maria (2018). Recognizing Miracles in Antiquity and Beyond. De Gruyter. ISBN 9783110563559.
- Marjanović-Dušanić, Smilja (2011). "The Byzantine apocalyptic tradition a fourteenth-century Serbian version of the Apocalypse of Anastasia". Balcanica (42): 25–36. doi:10.2298/BALC1142025M. hdl:21.15107/rcub_reff_1185.
- Stephenson, Paul (2016). The Serpent Column: A Cultural Biography. Oxford University Press. ISBN 9780190209063.
