= Virgin's veil =

Christian relic believed to have belonged to Mary

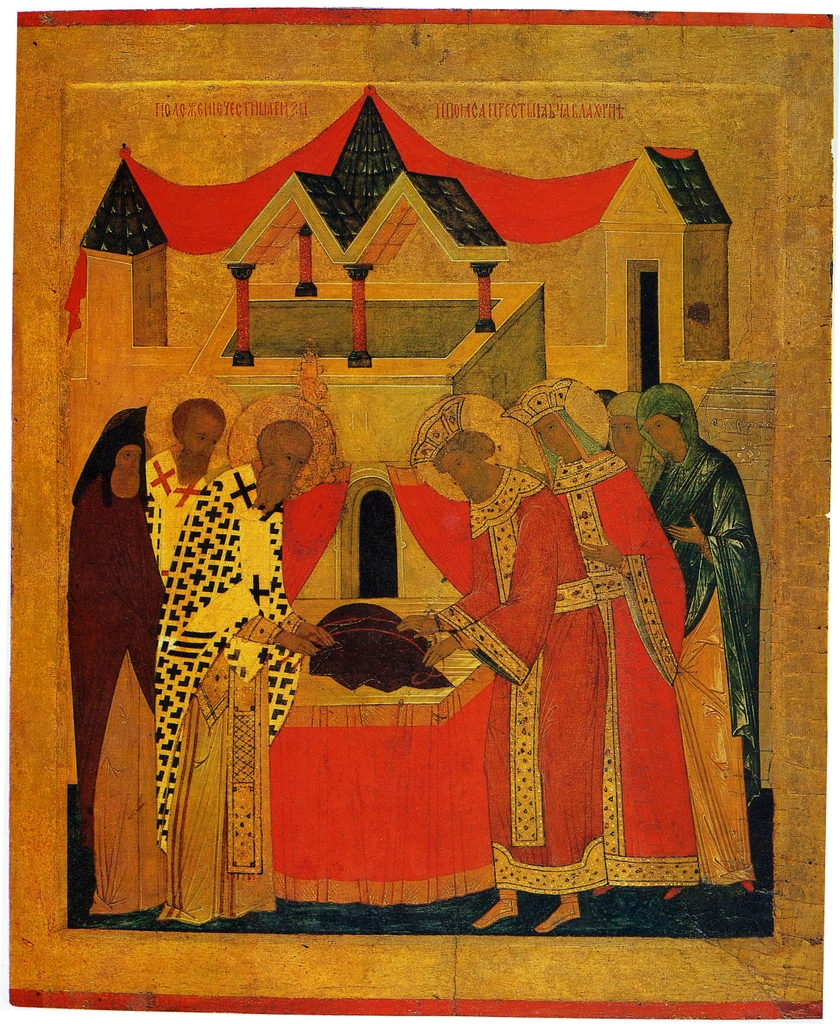
Deposition of the Robe of the Virgin on an icon from 1485

The Virgin's veil was a Christian relic believed to have once belonged to Mary, mother of Jesus. It was kept in Constantinople, capital of the Byzantine Empire, between the 5th and 12th centuries. There are several accounts of the appearance of the garment of Mary in Constantinople, but they are not consistent in describing what kind of garment it was, how it was associated with Mary or how it came to Constantinople. A similar relic, perhaps from Constantinople, has been kept in Chartres Cathedral since the 9th or 10th century.

== Maphorion at Constantinople ==
In a sermon of Patriarch Euthymius I of Constantinople (907–912) in the Menologion of Basil II, it is said that the Emperor Arcadius (395–424) acquired the relic, which Mary had worn at the birth of Jesus and placed it in a basilica dedicated to the Virgin in Blachernae. According to the Euthymiac History, the Empress Pulcheria (450–453) asked for Marian relics from the Patriarch Juvenal of Jerusalem, who sent her two dresses (ἱμάτια, imatia) and a burial shroud (ἐντάφια, entaphia) in a casket, which she deposited in the basilica in Blachernae. In the 7th century, Theodore Synkellos records that the relic and its casket had been stolen from a Jewish widow by two patricians named Galbios and Kandidos. Mary, he reported, had left the "garment" (ἐσθής, esthēs) to her friends in her will. It was the same one she had worn while nursing Jesus. In the 8th century, Andrew of Crete claimed in a sermon that the garment was stained with droplet of milk. He called it a "belt" (ζώνη, zōnē).

Theodore Synkellos seems to be the earliest eyewitness to put the relic in Constantinople before the Avar siege of 626. It is possible that it attained great significance only from its association with that event. The first source to call the garment a veil (περιβολή, peribolē) is Patriarch Photios I of Constantinople, writing about the Rus' siege of 860. Writers from the 10th century on consistently call it a maphorion, a type of mantle covering the head and shoulders.

The reliquary (soros) of the veil was kept in a circular church attached to the basilica in Blachernae. It was taken for safekeeping to the Hagia Sophia during the Avar raid of 619. Its return to Blachernae in 620 was celebrated annually on 2 July. Several times the relic was taken out to reportedly miraculous effect: its presence on the walls of Constantinople dispersed an Avar siege in 626, an Arab siege in 718 and a Rus' siege in 860. The reliquary was used in certain imperial ceremonies, according to the 10th-century Book of Ceremonies. In 906, the relic was taken from Blachernae to help heal the Empress Zoe Zaoutzaina from a demon. On 9 November 926, the Emperor Romanos I wore the maphorion when he left Constantinople to negotiate with Tsar Simeon I of Bulgaria.

The Life of Andrew the Fool records how Andrew the Fool in the early 10th century had a vision in which Mary raised her veil over the congregation as a sign of protection. In 963, a piece of the veil was placed in the reliquary now known as the Limburg Staurotheke. In 1075, Michael Psellos recorded how a "usual miracle" occurred every Friday night in Blachernae. A veil placed over an icon of Mary was miraculously raised in the evening and lowered Saturday morning. This miracle became famous throughout Europe. In 1089, the Emperor Alexios I became the last known emperor to carry the maphorion into battle when he carried it as a battle standard against the Cumans. Defeated, he had to stash the maphorion in a tree, although it was recovered. It appears that Alexios took the relic from the church in March 1107 while marching out against the Normans. The failure of the "usual miracle", however, compelled him quickly to return with it. Thereafter, the cult of Marian relics was gradually superseded by that of Marian icons. Alexios' biography, the Alexiad is one of the last works to refer to the maphorion of Mary as an actual relic.

== Sancta Camisa at Chartres ==
Around the same time, in the early 12th century, the first accounts appeared in the West describing the transfer of a Marian relic in Chartres Cathedral from Constantinople in the 9th century. This relic, the Sancta Camisa, was not usually called a veil. It is usually described as a chemise (undergarment) or tunic, or occasionally a supparum (shawl), all garments typically of linen. According to the 12th-century story, it was donated to Chartres by King Charles the Bald in 876. Later and legendary accounts, like the Pèlerinage de Charlemagne, claim that it was taken from Constantinople by Charles's grandfather, Charlemagne. The relic may have been a diplomatic gift from the Byzantine emperor to Charlemagne, later given by his grandson to Chartres. The earliest source to mention the relic in Chartres is Dudo of Saint-Quentin around 1000. By then the relic had been placed in a reliquary. Later accounts attribute to it the same miraculous properties as the veil in Constantinople. Its intervention supposedly saved the city from a Viking siege in 911. It remained hidden from view until the reliquary was opened in 1712, revealing not a linen undergarment but two long bands of luxury cloth, one in silk wrapped in another in silk and linen with embroidery. By the early 19th century, the actual relic was commonly called the Virgin's veil.

== See also ==
- Cincture of the Theotokos
- Girdle of Thomas
- Holy Girdle
