= Euthymiac History =

Chalcedonian ecclesiastical history

The Euthymiac History (Ancient Greek: Εὐθυμιακὴ ἱστορία, romanized: Euthymiakē historia; Latin: Historia Euthymiaca) is a Chalcedonian ecclesiastical history preserved today only in fragments quoted in other works. It is notable for containing the earliest reference to the doctrine of the Assumption of Mary.

== Textual history ==
The Euthymiac History was written in Greek sometime between about 550 and 750, or perhaps even as early as the early 6th century. A date late in the 9th century has been proposed, but must be rejected. The meaning of the term "Euthymiac" or "Euthymian" is uncertain. John Wortley reads it as a reference to a lost biography of Euthymius the Great. The passages that survive do not belong to the known biography of Euthymius by Cyril of Scythopolis.

Its surviving two fragments both cover the middle of the 5th century. One excerpt is found in John of Damascus's second sermon on the Dormition, written between about 730 and 750. The earliest manuscript of the sermon dates to 890. The passage excerpted from the Euthymiac History is usually regarded as an interpolation, although every surviving copy of the sermon includes it. The same excerpt as found in John's sermon is found independently in the manuscript Sinaiticus gr. 491 of the 8th or 9th century. It was incorporated into the Synaxarion of Constantinople and is also known in Arabic translation. The same tradition, perhaps also drawn from the Euthymiac History, is found in Cosmas Vestitor's fourth sermon on the Dormition.

Another excerpt is quoted in the Pandects of Nikon of the Black Mountain (11th century), whence it found its way into the Ecclesiastical History of Nikephoros Kallistos Xanthopoulos (14th century). It concerns the Archbishop Flavian of Constantinople (446–449) and Chrysaphius, chief minister of Theodosius II. The same episode in similar language is related in Theophanes the Confessor, but he does not cite the Euthymiac History. It has been suggested that Nikon invented the attribution on the basis of similarities between his text and the text in John of Damascus, including the figure of Pulcheria.

== Content ==
The interpolator who added the excerpt to John of Damascus's sermon specifies that he is excerpting from chapter 40 of the third book of the Euthymiac History. This interpolation was made early in the history of the text and so achieved a wide distribution. According to the excerpt, at the time of the council of Chalcedon in 451, the Emperor Marcian and Empress Pulcheria asked Patriarch Juvenal of Jerusalem to have relics of Mary, mother of Jesus, sent to Constantinople. Juvenal replied that there were no bodily relics of Mary. Three days after Mary's Dormition, one of the apostles arrived and asked to see inside her tomb. When it was opened, her body was no longer there, only her funeral shroud. Upon being told this, the imperial couple requested the garment and, after his return, Juvenal had it sent to Constantinople, where it was placed in a church in Blachernae.

The account of the Dormition in the Euthymiac History belongs to the so-called "late apostle" tradition, a collection of independent legends that relate how one apostle arrived late and did not witness the Dormition. Although often called Thomas, that name does not appear to have been in the Euthymiac History. It has been suggested that Juvenal may have invented the doctrine of the Assumption to guard the body of Mary against imperial expropriation, but there is no evidence for the existence of Mary's body as a relic or place of pilgrimage. That a robe purportedly belonging to Mary arrived in Constantinople in a casket at some point before the 7th century is certain, and the Euthymiac History may contain an accurate account of its origin.

The speech of Juvenal contains a long quotation from the Pseudo-Dionysian Divine Names.
