= Holy Intercession Church, Sutkivtsi =

Holy Intercession Church
- Свято-Покровська церква
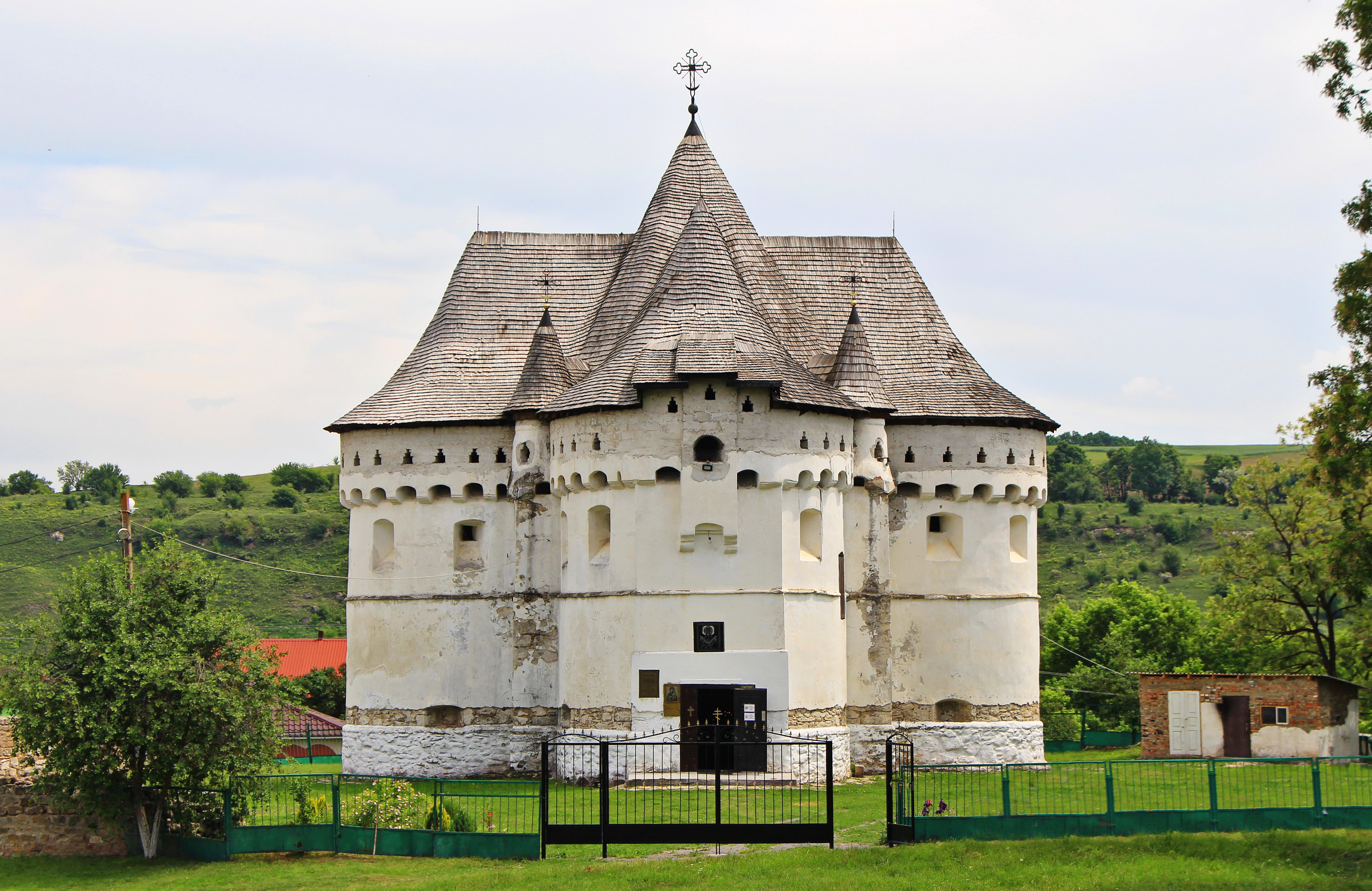
- Entrance view in 2019
- Holy Intercession Church
- 49°10′36.54″N 26°55′55.64″E
- Location: Sutkivtsi, Khmelnytskyi Oblast
- Country: Ukraine
- Denomination: Orthodox Church of Ukraine
- Previous denomination: Ukrainian Orthodox Church (Moscow Patriarchate)

Architecture
- Style: Gothic
- Years built: 1476

Immovable Monument of National Significance of Ukraine
- Official name: Церква-фортеця (Fortress-church)
- Type: Architecture
- Reference no.: 220056

The Holy Intercession Church (Ukrainian: Свято-Покровська церква) is a stone fortified church, built in honor of the feast of the Intercession. It is located in the village of Sutkivtsi, Khmelnytskyi Raion, Khmelnytskyi Oblast, Ukraine. It functions as both a fortress and a church. The Intercession Church is a unique example of defensive construction in Podillia, and is now a functioning church and museum. It is one of the oldest defensive churches in Ukraine and the only medieval defensive temple of the tetraconch type. Its closest analogue is the keep church of the castle in Étampes, France.

== History ==
Originally, the Intercession Church was constructed as a defensive structure, as the village was located on the Kuchman Trail (part of the Black Trail), which was periodically raided by Tatars.

In 1476 the fortress was rebuilt into a church with a brick ribbed vault on the first tier and Gothic nervures above the second tier of the central space. In the 16th century, the walls of the first tier were painted with frescoes; fragments of them have survived to this day.

The castle and Holy Intercession Church in Sutkivtsi in 19th century by Napoleon Orda

In the second half of the 18th century, a two-tiered wooden bell tower with a Baroque spire was erected above the porch. It is likely that at the same time the western facade of the building was converted into a front façade and the entrance to the church was arranged there.

In 1894 and later in 1903, the building underwent reconstruction with the dismantling of the gables; the slender shingle roofs were replaced with sloping tin roofs. As a result of this series of reconstructions, the church lost its old Gothic and Baroque forms and acquired features typical of diocesan churches common in the Russian Empire.

During the Soviet anti-religious persecution, the temple was closed twice: from 1939 to 1942 and from 1946 to 1989.

As a result of amateur unprofessional repairs in the 1990s, the monument was plastered from the outside and inside with cement mortar, which led to the walls becoming damp and the loss of most of the frescoes. In 2006, experts recorded the building's critical condition.

A major restoration of the monument was carried out in 2006–2009 according to the project of famous Ukrainian restorers Yevhenia Plamenytska (1927–1994) and Candidate of Architectural Sciences Olha Plamenytska.

As a result of the emergency work, the walls of the temple were dried, the cement plaster was partially removed, and the emergency condition was eliminated. The lost medieval roof, which rested on a central pillar in the style of medieval towers-keeps, was returned to the monument. The pillar was fully preserved on the first tier, but was dismantled on the second during the dismantling of the gables (the remains of the lower part were preserved). The partially destroyed battle parapet with machicolations on the second tier and defensive galleries in the interior of the temple were restored. It is planned to complete the restoration with the complete removal of the cement plaster and the disclosure of the frescoes, restoration of the church's interior, and landscaping of the adjacent territory. The work was carried out with funds allocated by the Ministry of Regional Development and Construction in 2007–2009 at the request of the Yarmolyntsia Raion Administration and the church community of the village of Sutkivtsi.

As of the 2010s, the Intercession Church is an active place of worship.

On 7 February 2019, the community of the church (without the priest) decided to transition from UOC-MP to OCU. In April 2021, the Supreme Court of Ukraine rejected all arguments of the former pro-Moscow priest, and the church received a new legal status.

== Architecture ==
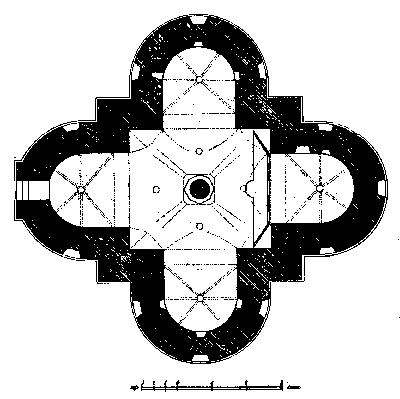
Plan of the church

In its spatial planning, the Sutkivtsi Intercession Church belongs to the type of tetraconch structures with a central volume (10 x 11 m) and four semi-cylindrical towers adjacent to it. The western semicircle along the façade and the entire height of the walls is highlighted by a straight section of 3.8 m.

The walls are 1.5–1.8 m thick and made of small stone filled with limestone mortar.

The ceilings above the first tier are a system of brick cross and conch vaults with formwork on the nervures. In the central space they rest on a pillar, forming fan-shaped bundles of nervures at its corners; in the semicircles, separated from the central space by arches, there is some semblance of a star vault. In the places where the nervures rest, cantilever blocks of various designs are laid, and the rock blocks with heraldic shields are located along the upper line of the vault.

The stairs to the second floor are internal and made of stone. The façades were originally covered with ochre-colored grout mixed with crushed brick. On the second tier, machicules (for foot combat) have been preserved: the central machicule is above the entrance, the lower part of the pillar that rose from the basement tier and supported the hipped roof (the base of the pillar can be seen in the basement floor). The lower parts of the gables, disassembled and leveled with the roof, have been preserved. On the second tier, the corner turrets-bartisans at the corners of the central volume of the church are of interest. The roof is made of shingles.

The frescoes are partially preserved under the cement plaster. They date back to the 16th century, and above them are the remains of a 19th-century oil painting, lost during amateur renovations in the 1990s.

There were cellars under the church where many human remains were discovered. In addition, an underground passage led to the Sutkivtsi Castle.

The monument is a work of architectural art of the 14th–18th centuries, and has no analogues in its architecture and planning in the country.

As of July 2011, the state has allocated 5.5 million hryvnias for restoration work, but its start is still awaited.

== Gallery ==
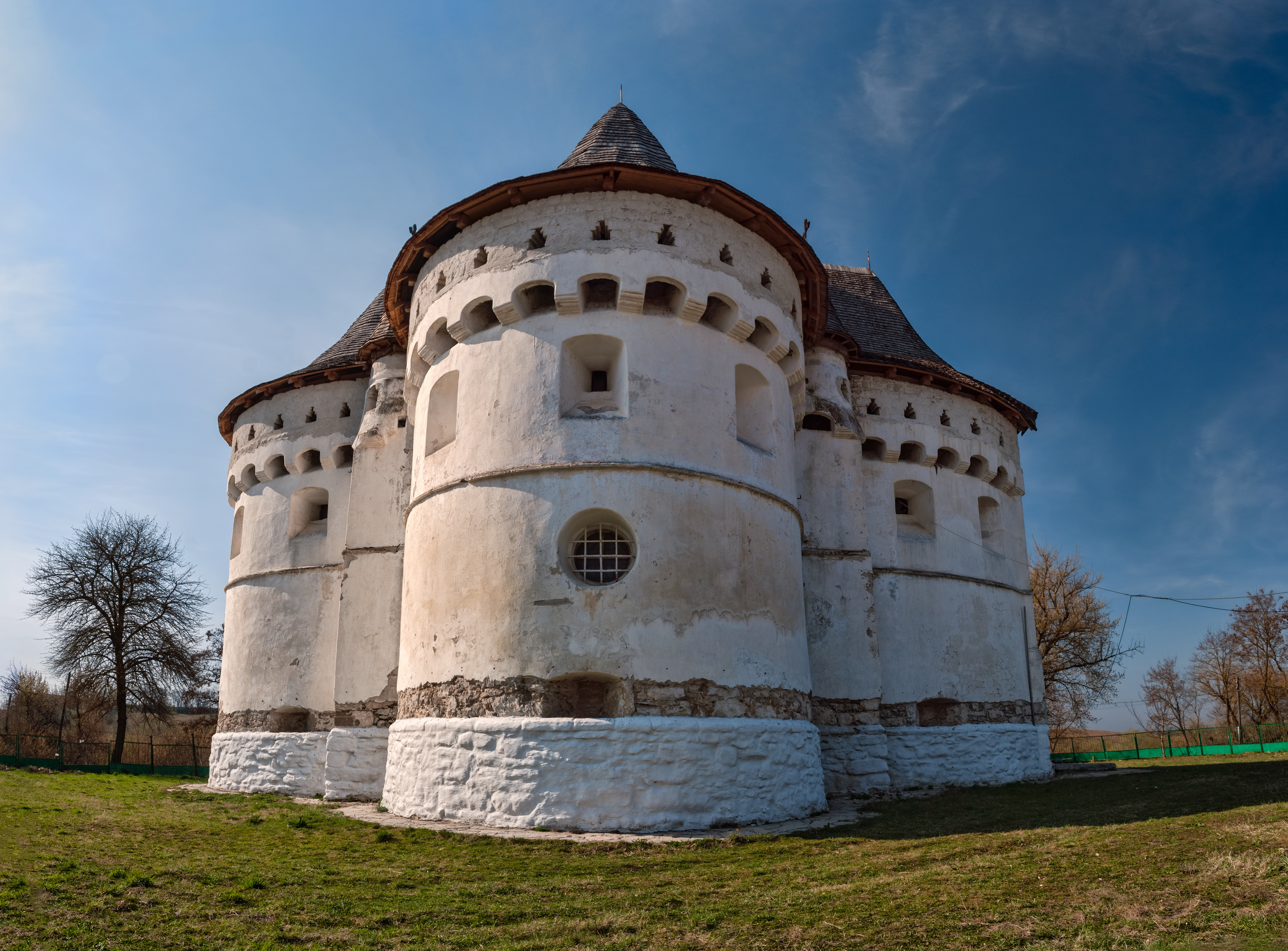
View of a semicircular side

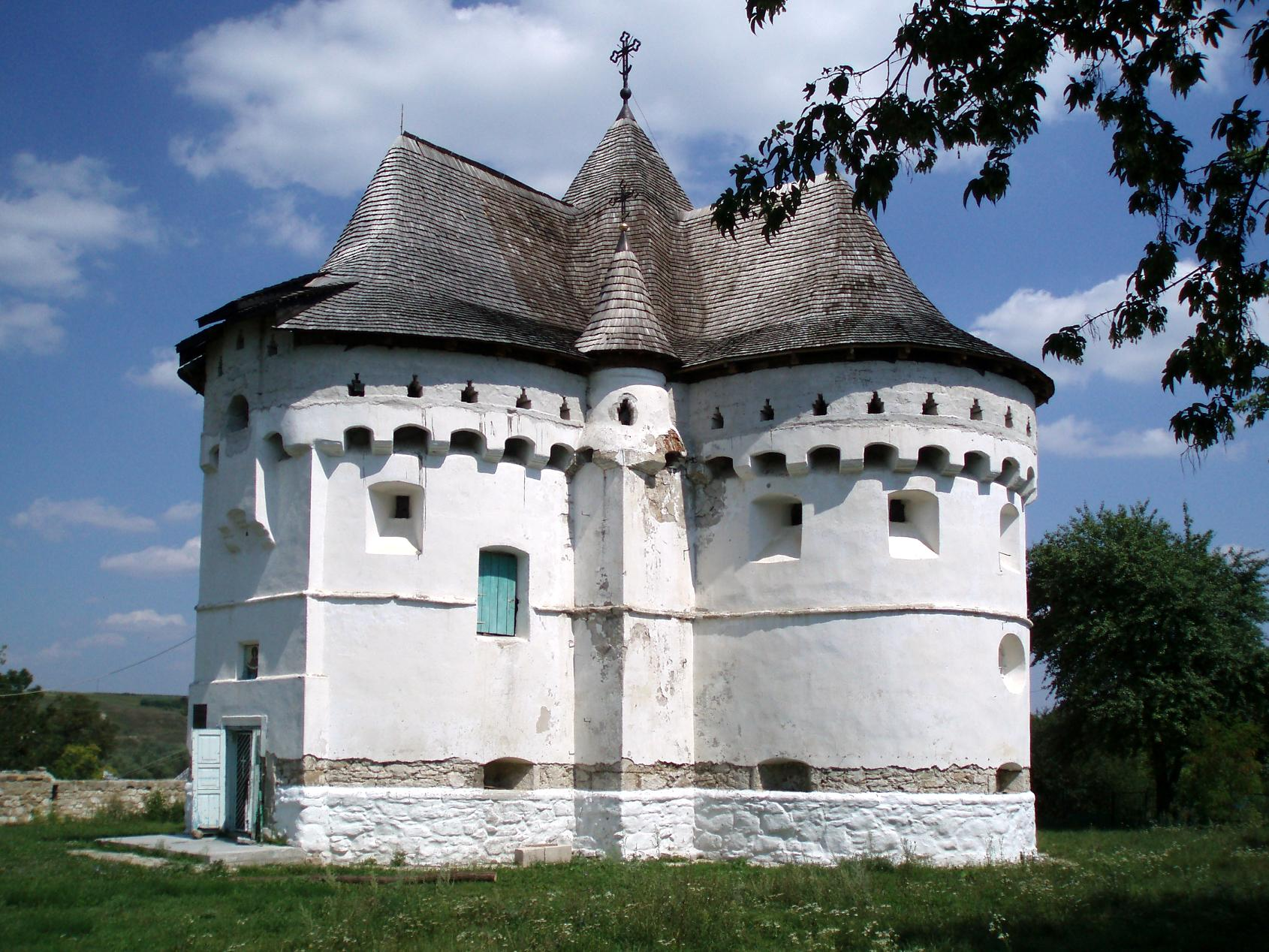
Corner view

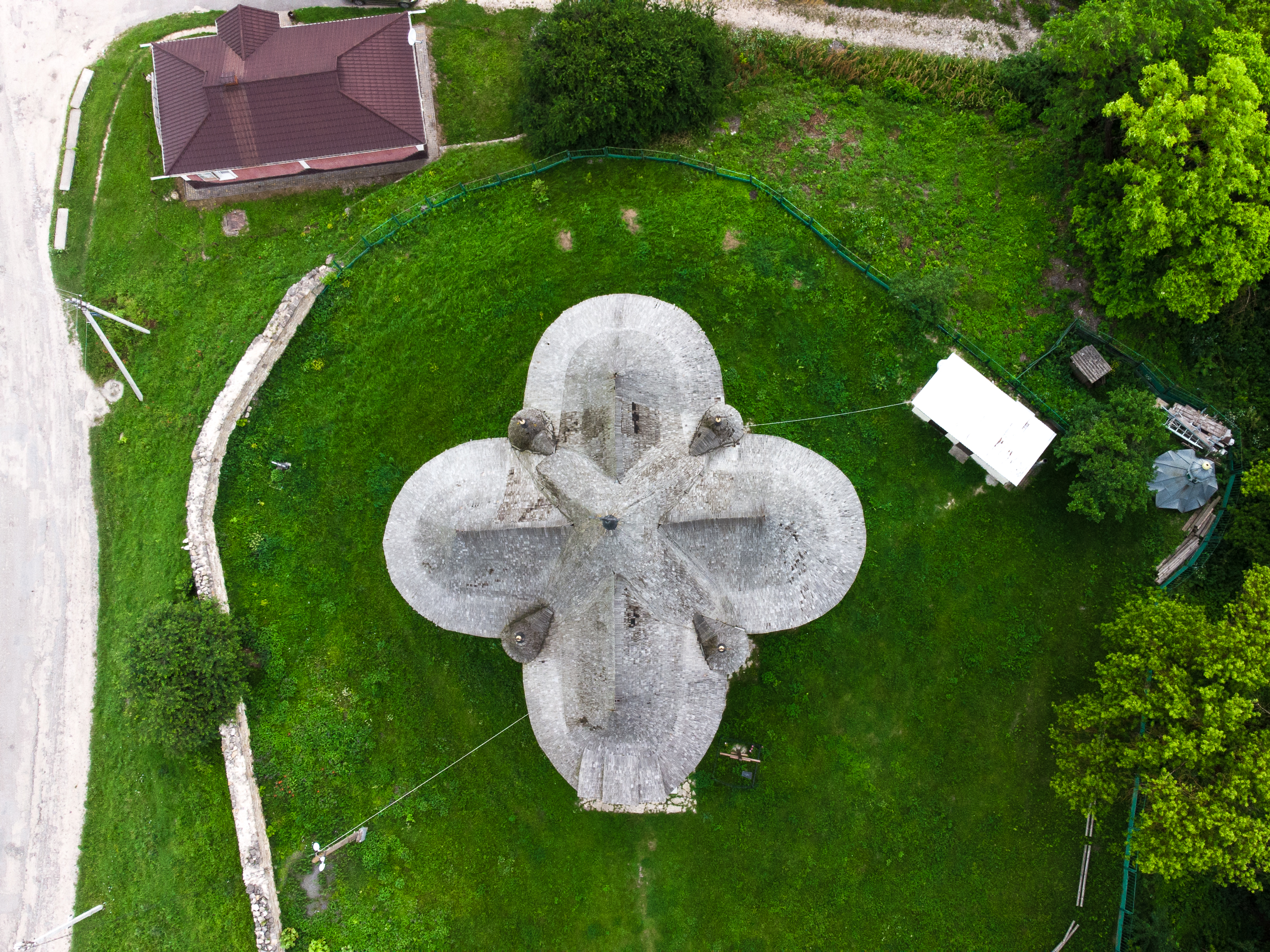
Top view

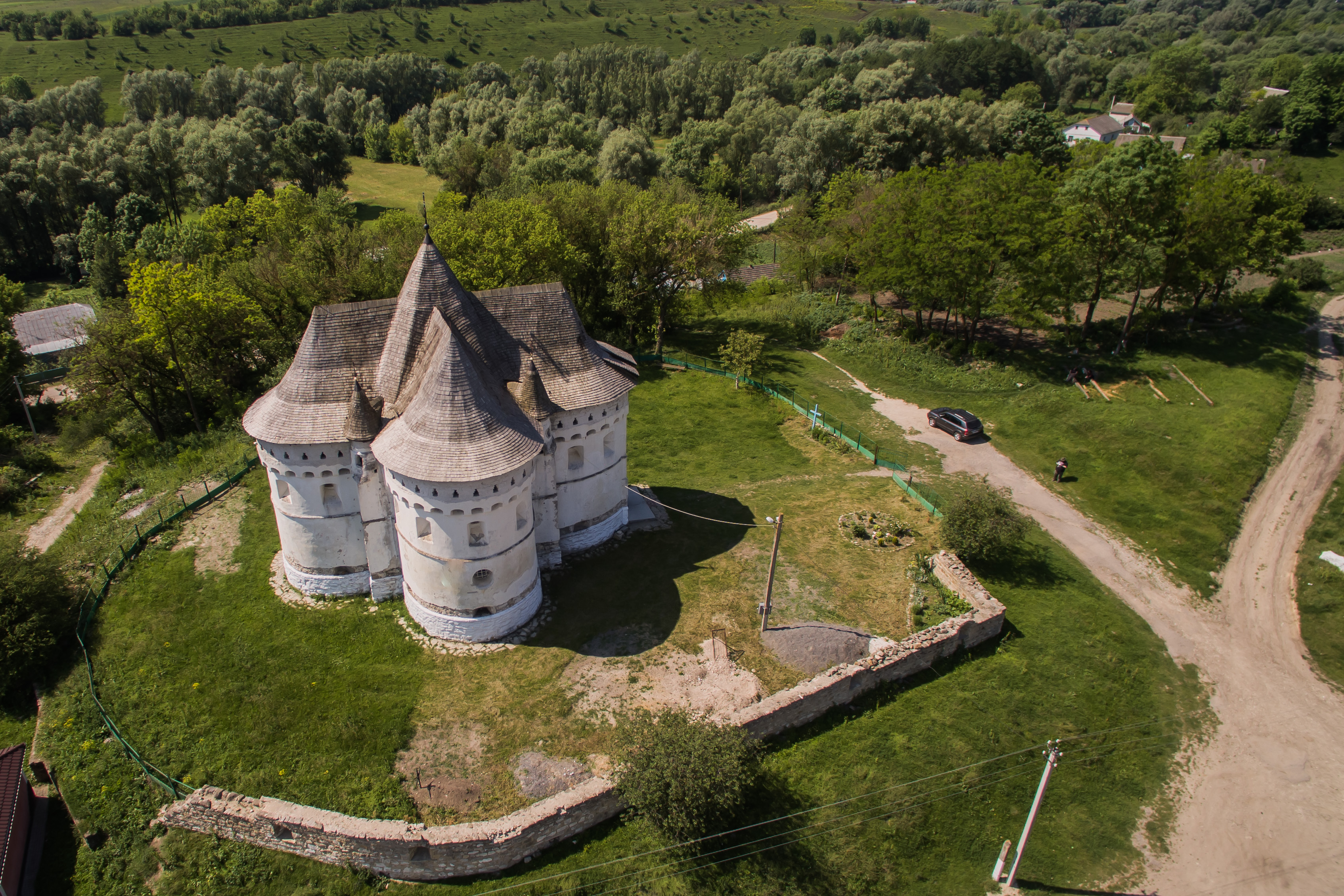
Bird's eye view

360° view

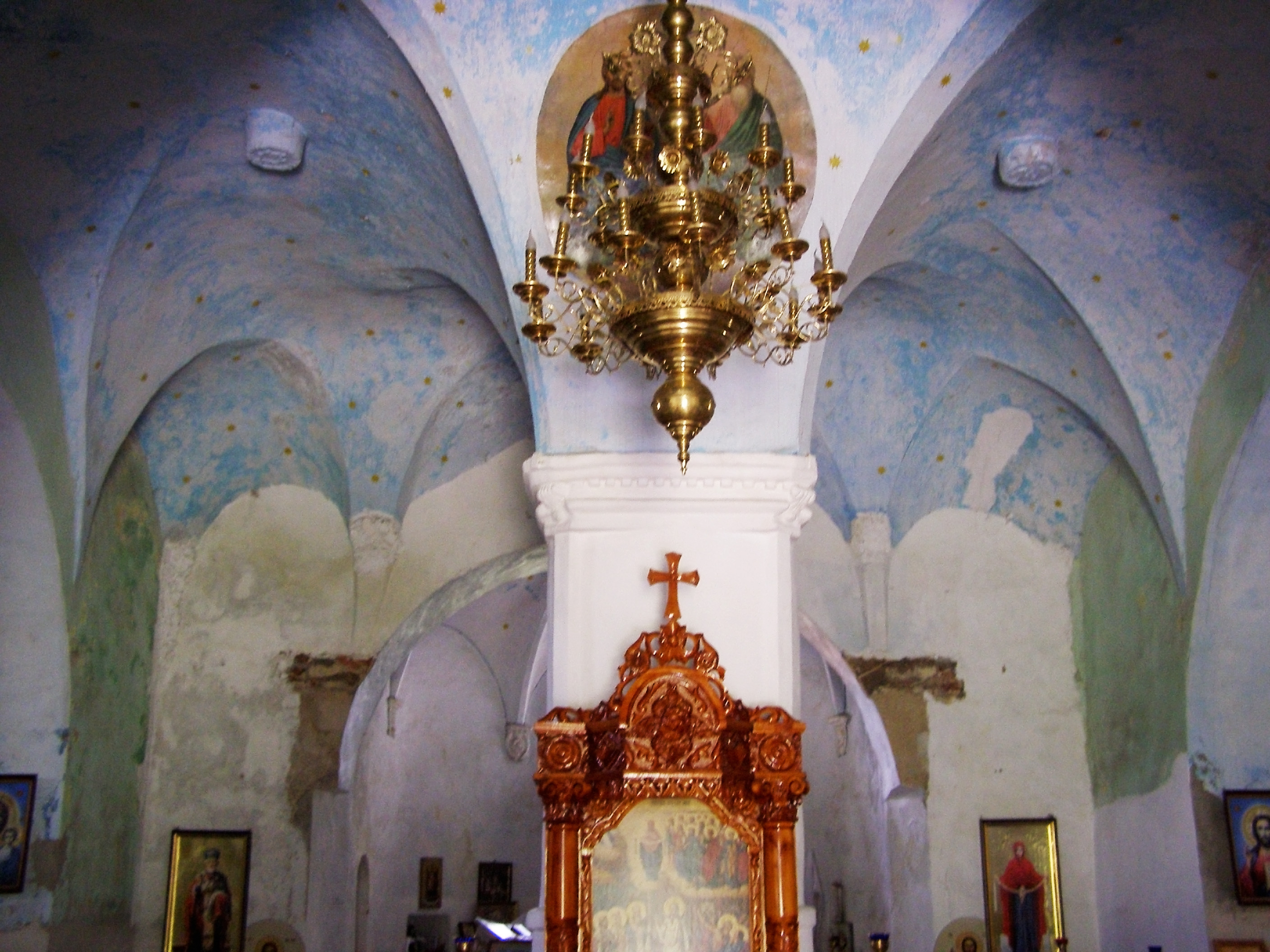
Interior

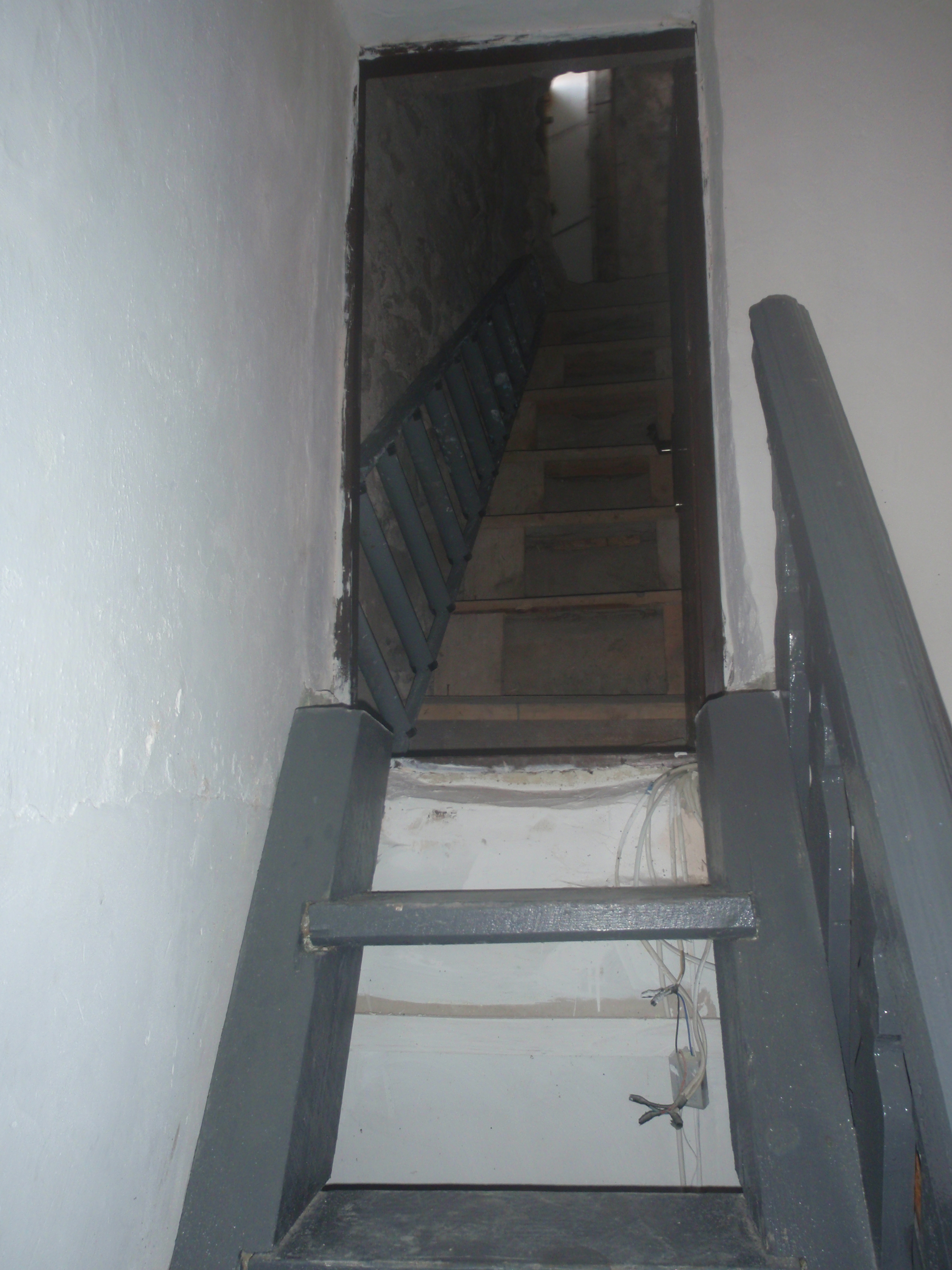
Stairs to the second floor

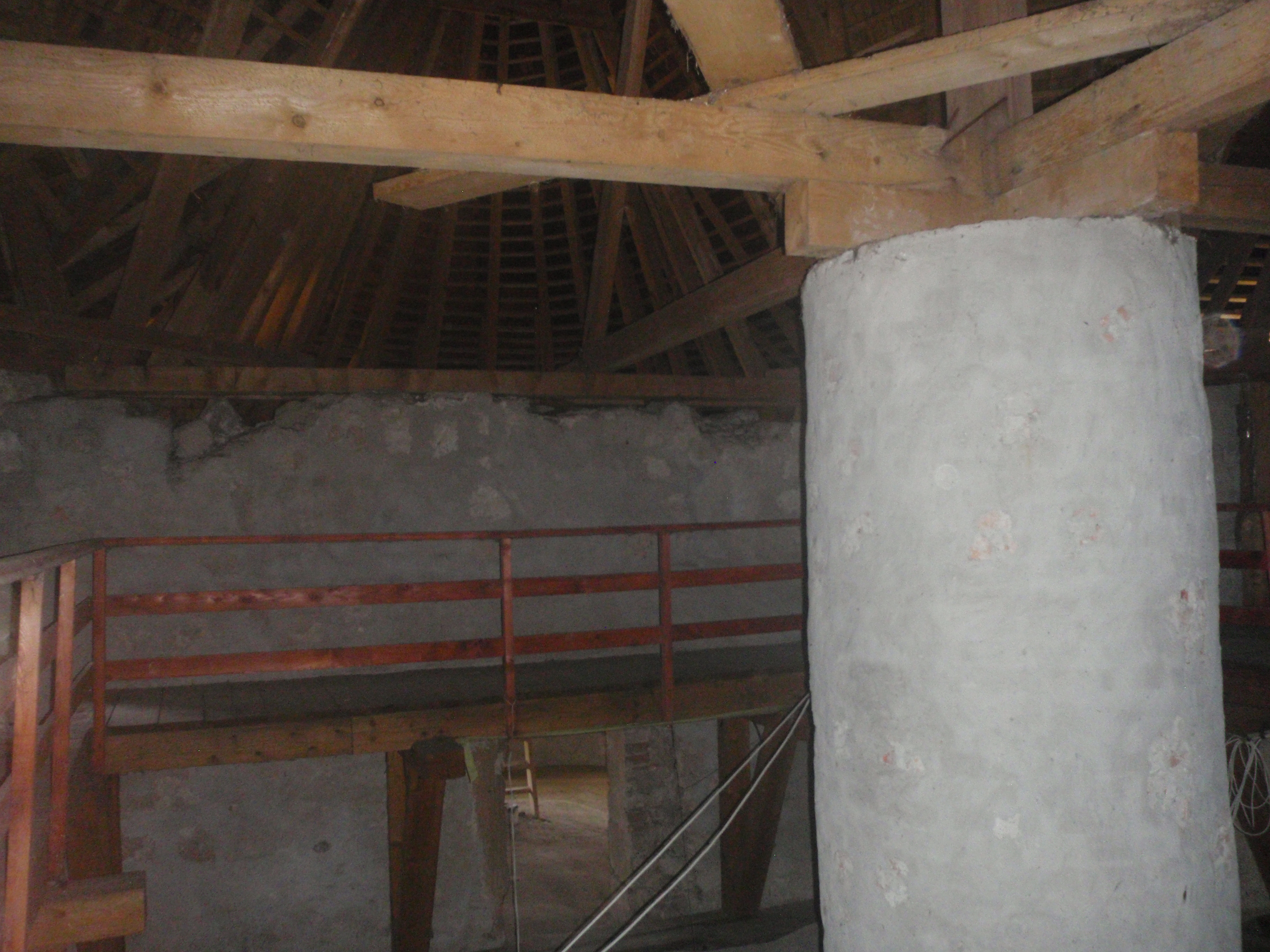
Pillar

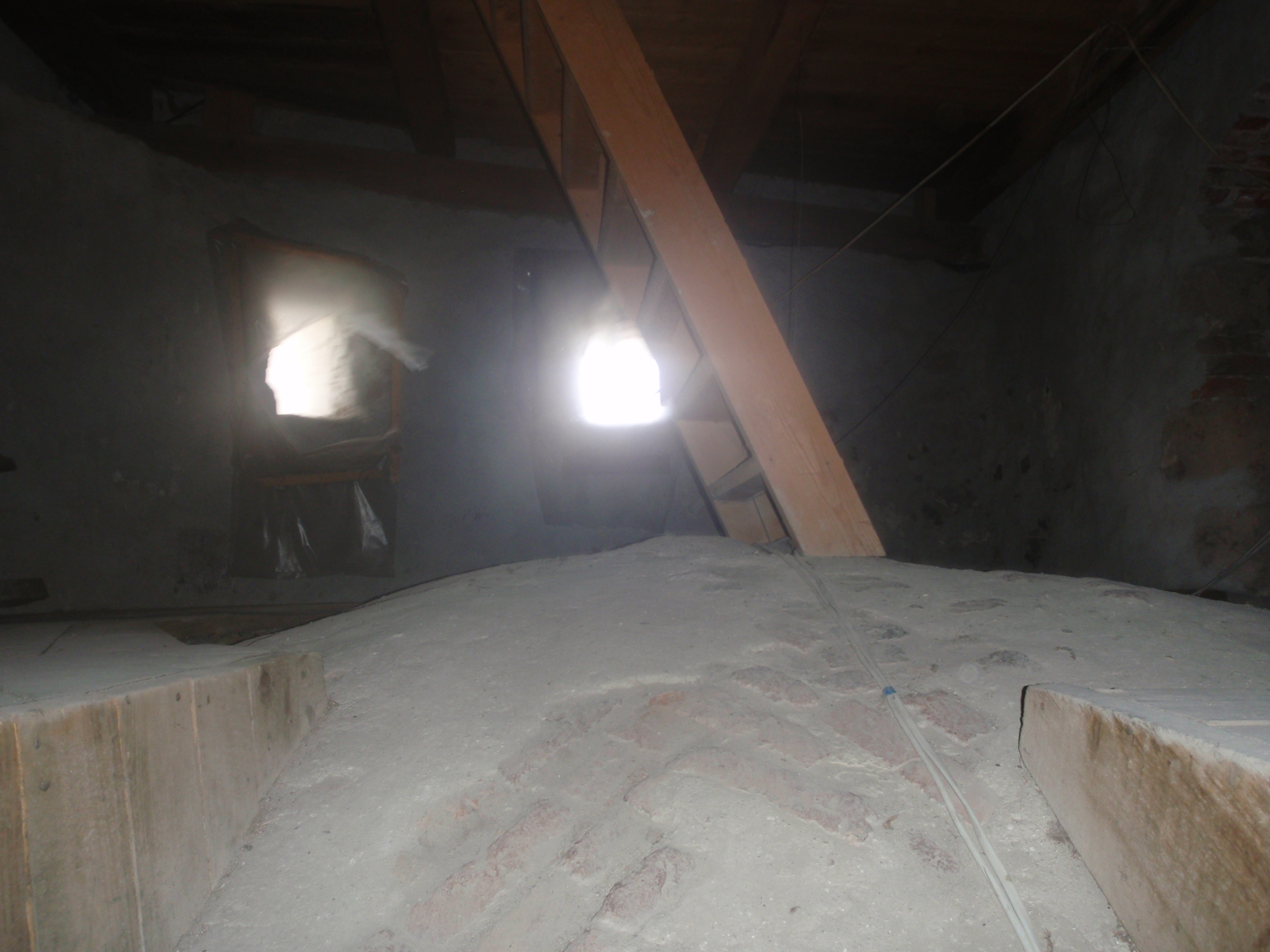
Parapet with machicolations

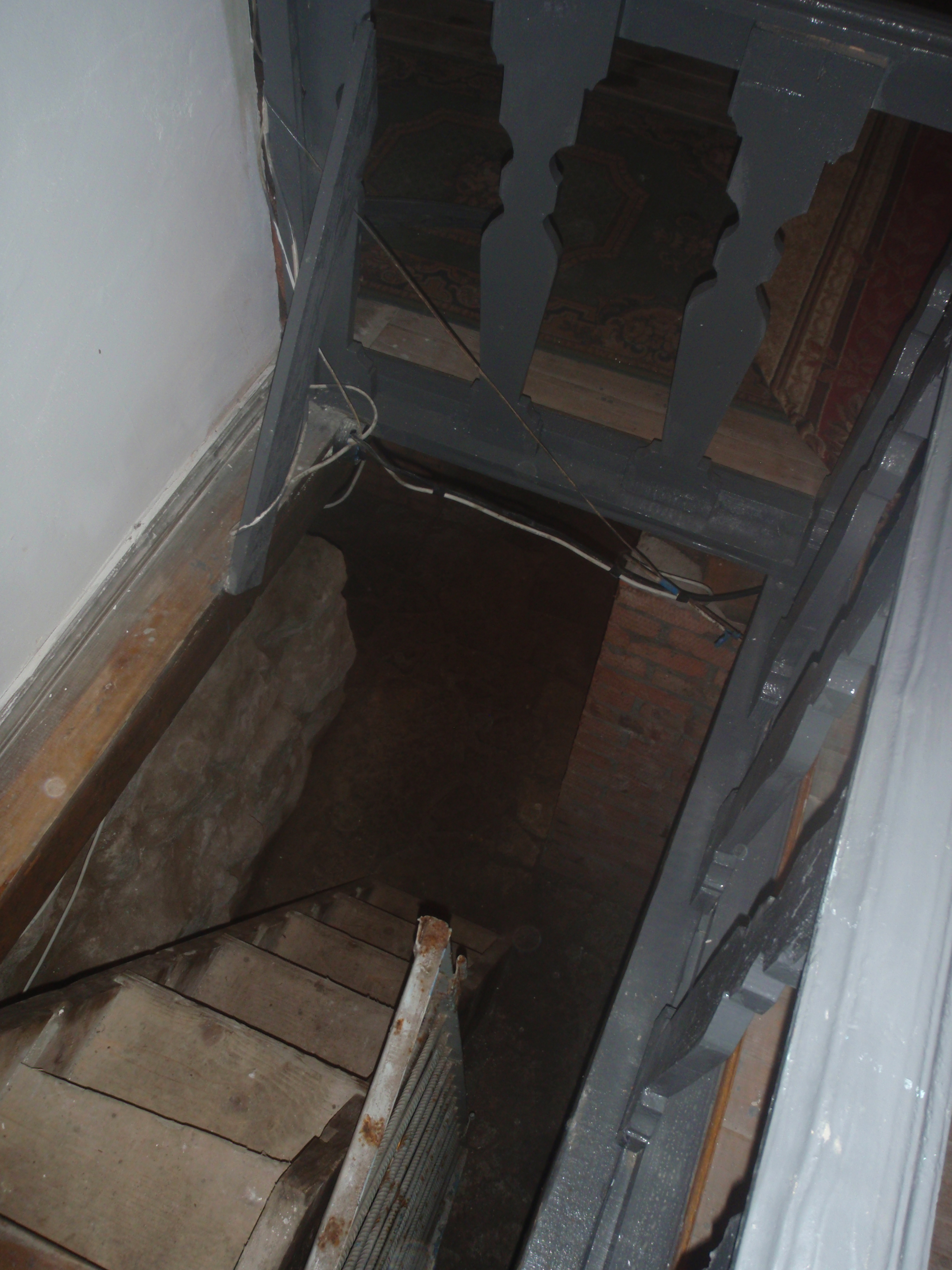
Entrance to the basement

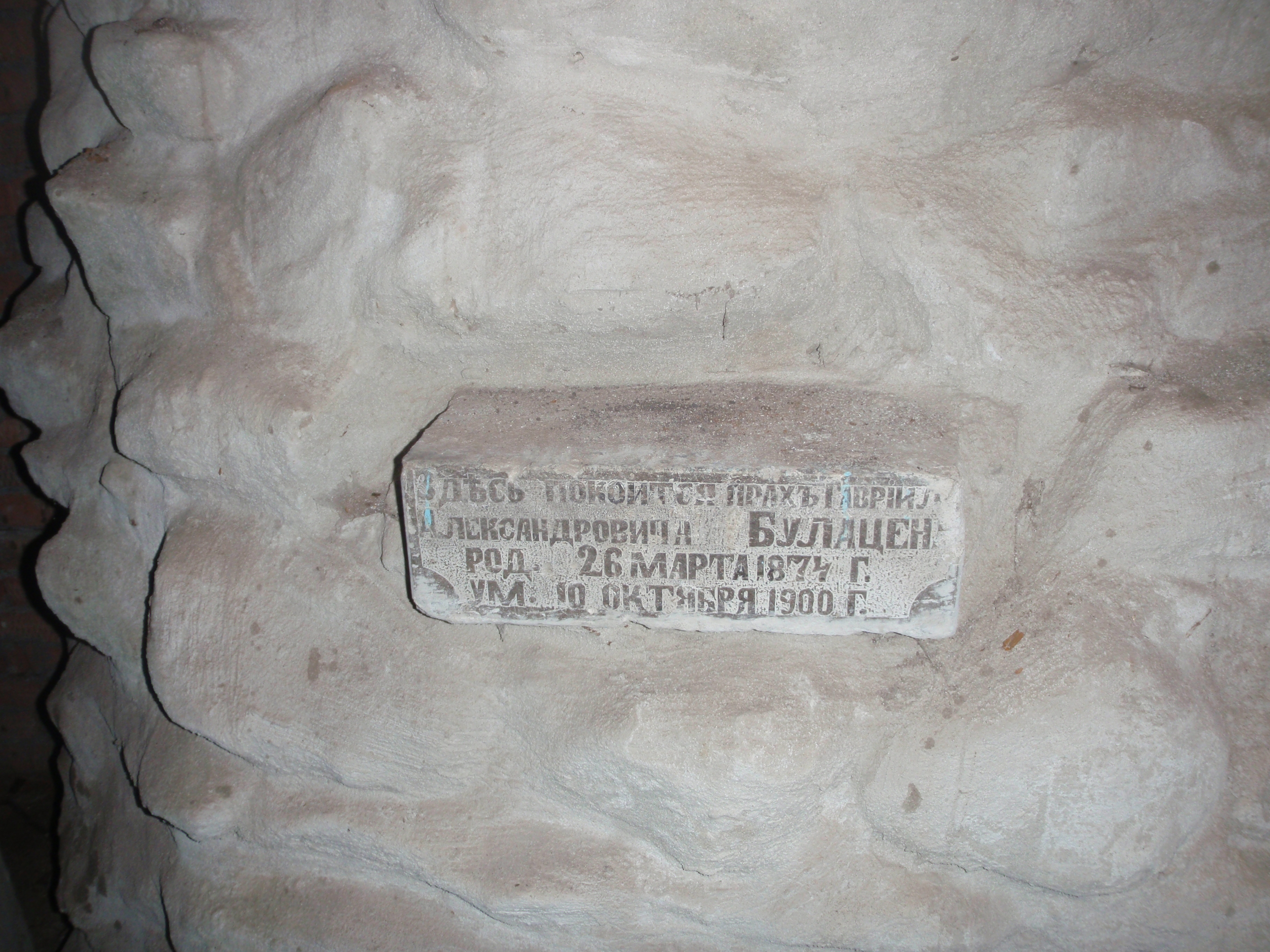
Grave in the basement

The church in 1861

== Sources ==
- Kurus, I.; Bazhenov, L.; Boyev, Y. (2010). Путівник. Хмельницька область [Guidebook. Khmelnytskyi Oblast] (in Ukrainian). Kyiv: Bohdana. p. 320. ISBN 978-966-425-010-5.
- Lohvyn, H. N. (1959). Оборонні споруди в Сутківцях [Defensive structures in Sutkivtsi] (in Ukrainian). Derzhbudvydav. p. 12.
- Lypa, K. A. (2013). Smoliy, Valeriy (ed.). Церква-фортеця в Сутківцях [Fortified church in Sutkivtsi] (PDF). Encyclopedia of History of Ukraine (in Ukrainian). 10. Kyiv: Institute of History of Ukraine: 470. ISBN 978-966-00-1359-9.
- Plamenytska, Olha (1994). Початок мурованого оборонного будівництва на Поділлі [Beginnings of stone defensive construction in Podillia]. Архітектурна спадщина України (in Ukrainian) (1): 39–57.
- Plamenytska, Olha (2005). Сакральна архітектура Кам'янця на Поділлі [Sacral architecture of Kamianets in Podillia]. Кам'янець-Подільський: Абетка (in Ukrainian): 208–209.
- Plamenytska, Olha (2008). Церква-донжон у Сутківцях. До питання типології середньовічного оборонного будівництва Поділля [Keep-church in Sutkivtsi. To the question of the typology of the medieval defensive construction of Podillia]. Українська академія мистецтв. Дослідницькі та науково-методичні праці (in Ukrainian) (15): 155–169.
- Plamenytska, Olha (2000). Церква-замок Покрова Богородиці [Castle Church of Intercession of Theotokos]. Пам'ятки архітектури та містобудування України. Довідник Державного реєстру національного культурного надбання (in Ukrainian): 271–272.
- Plamenytska, Olha (1992). Замок в Сутковцах [Castle in Sutkivtsi]. Архитектурное наследство (in Russian) (39): 148–155.
- Plavutsky, G. G. (1905). Церковь-замок в Сутковцах Летичевского уезда [Castle Church in Sutkivtsi in Letychiv uezd]. Деревянные и каменные храмы (in Russian): 45–50. Archived from the original on 4 April 2015.
- Sichynsky, V. (1929). Сутківська твердиня [Sutkivtsi Fortress]. Записки Наукового Товариства ім. Шевченка (in Ukrainian). 150: 143–180. Archived from the original on 25 April 2015.
- Sichynsky, V. (1935). Сутківці [Sutkivtsi]. Життя і знання (in Ukrainian) (2): 35–36.
- Sitsinskyi, Yukhym (1928). Оборонні замки західного Поділля: історично-археологічні нариси [Defensive castles of western Podillia: historical and archaeological essays]. Записки Історично-філологічного відділу ВУАН (in Ukrainian). 17: 64–160.
- Sitsinskyi, Yukhym (1889). Церковь-замок в Сутковцах Летичевского уезда [Castle Church in Sutkivtsi in Letychiv uezd]. Подольские епархиальные ведомости (in Russian) (2): 19–59.
- Zharikov, N. L. (ed.). Покровская церковь-замок, XIV—XV, XVIII ст.ст. [Intercession Castle-Church, 14th–15th, 18th centuries]. Памятники градостроительства и архитектуры Украинской ССР. в 4-х томах (in Russian). 4. Budivelnyk: 233. Archived from the original on 19 September 2010.
- Zharkykh, M. I. Храми Поділля. Довідник. (Ярмолинецький район) [Churches of Podillia. Handbook. (Yarmolyntsi Raion)]. Pradidivska Slava (in Ukrainian). Archived from the original on 8 June 2011.
- Церковь-замок в Сутковцах [Castle Church in Sutkivtsi]. Исторический вестник (in Russian) (2): 537. 1892.
