= Andrew the Fool =

Eastern Orthodox saint (died 936)

Saint Andrew the Fool
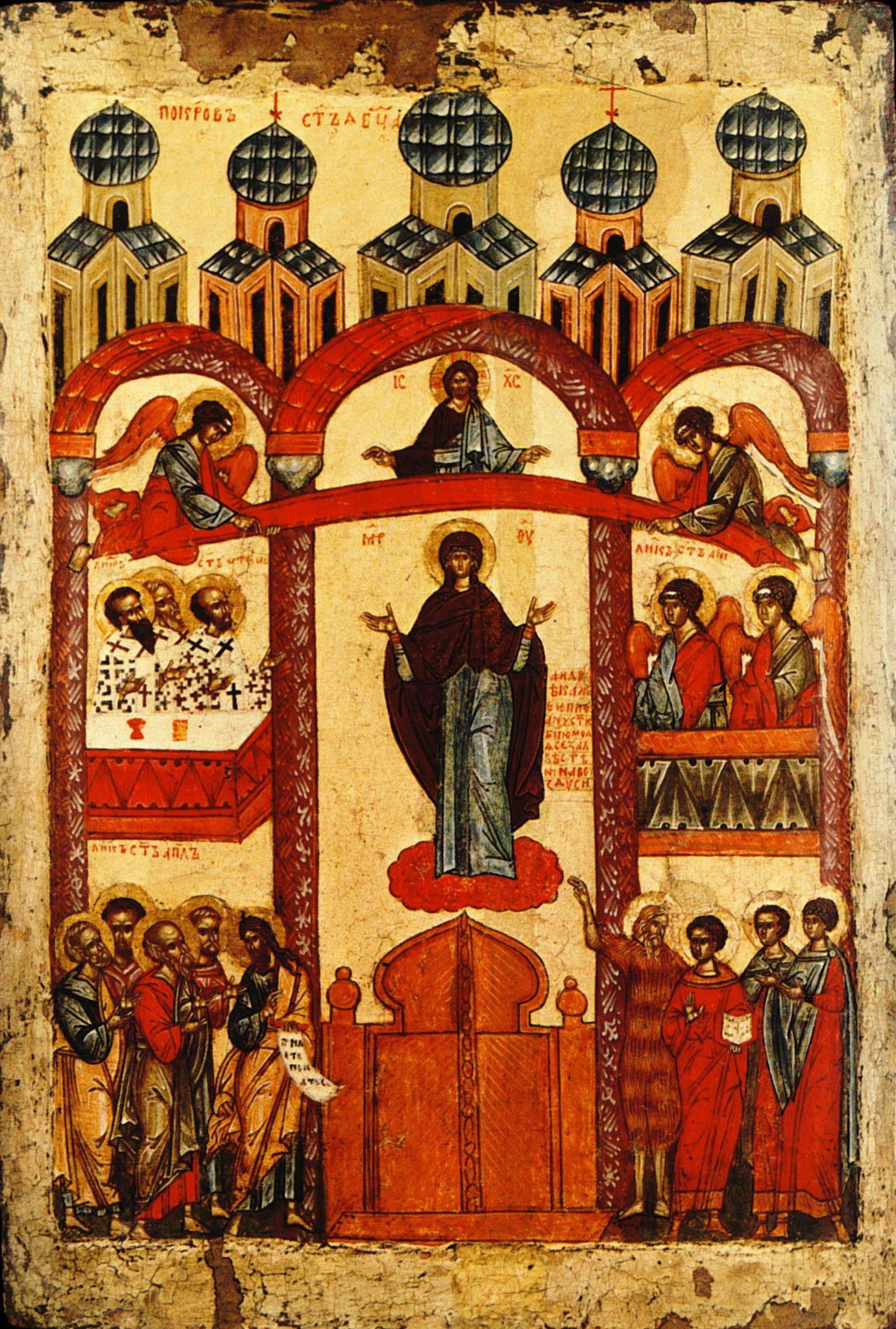
- The Protection of the Mother of God. Russian icon, Tretyakov Gallery, Moscow (1401–1425)
- Died: Constantinople
- Venerated in: Eastern Orthodox Church
- Feast: October 2 October 15

Andrew of Constantinople (Andrew the Fool-for-Christ or Andrew, the Fool; Greek: Ἀνδρέας ὁ Σαλός) is considered a saint by the Eastern Orthodox Church, and is revered as a fool for Christ.

According to the Life of Andrew the Fool, he lived in the fifth century, during the reign of Byzantine emperor Leo I; however, some historians believe he lived in the ninth to tenth centuries, during the reign of Leo VI, due to anachronisms in the text and similarities to the lives of other holy fools, including Simeon the Holy Fool and Basil the Younger.

== Biography ==
Over 110 complete and fragmentary Greek manuscripts containing various editions of the Life of Andrew the Fool have survived, with the oldest being a fragment of a manuscript dating to the second half of the 10th century. The Life says that Andrew lived during the time of Leo I (r. 457–474) as well as Daniel the Stylite (died 493).

Andrew, a Scythian by birth, was a slave of Theognostus, who was serving as a bodyguard in Constantinople. Later, he decided to become a fool for Christ, living out his goal with humility and patience.

According to certain sources, Andrew had a vision of the Most Holy Theotokos in the Blachernae church of Constantinople, while the city was surrounded by enemy troops (by some sources, Muslim Arabs).

Andrew and his disciple Epiphanius testified that they saw the Holy Virgin surrounded by many angels and Saints, praying and extending her omophorion (protection) over the faithful. After this vision, Constantinople was saved when its attackers retreated. That vision and the avoidance of Constantinople's destruction that was attributed to it inspired the creation of one of the most famous Eastern Orthodox holidays: the feast of the Protection of the Theotokos.

== Veneration ==
His memory is commemorated by Eastern Orthodox communities on 15 October [O.S. 2 October]. The earliest manuscript of his Greek hagiography, the Life of Andrew the Fool, is a quire in Munich in a 10th-century uncial script. The work was also translated into Georgian and Church Slavonic.

The Life was widely disseminated in Russian literature, with the account of Andrew's vision of the Holy Mother of God serving as the basis for a new Russian feast by Andrey Bogolyubsky in the 1160s. The first translation to Old Russian was completed in the late 11th or early 12th century. More than 200 copies of this translation are known, with the oldest complete copy dating to a 14th-century manuscript. No later than the 14th century, a new translation of the Life was completed by the South Slavs, likely Serbs.

== See also ==
- Foolishness for Christ
- The Protection of the Mother of God

== Sources ==
- "Андрей Юродивый" . Brockhaus and Efron Encyclopedic Dictionary (in Russian). 1906.
- Nikiforova, A. Yu.; Pivovarova, N. V. (2001). "Андрей Юродивый". Православная энциклопедия — Т. II: Алексий, человек Божий — Анфим Анхиальский. Православная энциклопедия. pp. 391–393. ISBN 5-89572-007-2.
