= Siege of Constantinople (860) =

Battle during the Rus'-Byzantine Wars

- Part of the Rus'–Byzantine Wars
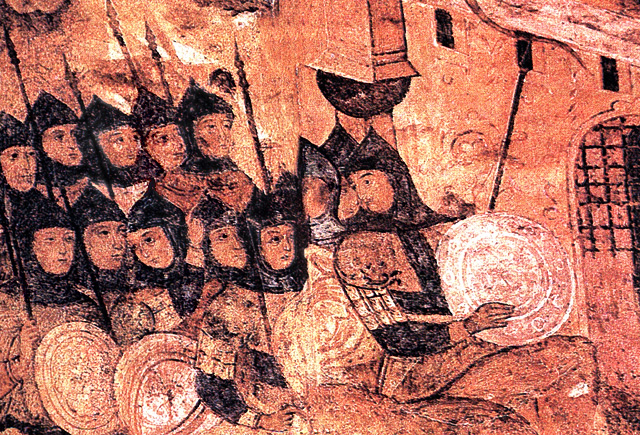
- The Rus' under the walls of Constantinople
Date	18 June 860 – 4 August 860
Location	Constantinople 41.0°N 28.9°E
Result	Rus' victory

Belligerents
Byzantine Empire	Rus'

Commanders and leaders
Michael III	Askold and Dir

Strength
Unknown	8,000 men

The siege of Constantinople in 860 was the only major military expedition of the Rus' recorded in Byzantine and western European sources. The casus belli was the construction of the fortress Sarkel by Byzantine engineers, restricting the Rus' trade route along the Don River in favour of the Khazars. Accounts vary, with discrepancies between contemporary and later sources, and the outcome is unknown in detail.

It is known from Byzantine sources that the Rus' caught Constantinople unprepared; preoccupied by the ongoing Arab–Byzantine wars, the empire was unable, at least initially, to make an effective response to the attack. After pillaging the suburbs of the Byzantine capital, the Rus' retreated for the day and continued their siege in the night after exhausting the Byzantine troops and causing disorganization. The event gave rise to a later Orthodox Christian tradition, which ascribed the deliverance of Constantinople to a miraculous intervention by the Theotokos.

== Background ==
The first mention of the Rus' near the Byzantine Empire comes from Life of St. George of Amastris, a hagiographic work whose dating is debated. The Byzantines had come into contact with the Rus' in 839. The timing of the attack suggests the Rus' had been informed of the city's weakness, demonstrating that the lines of trade and communication did not cease to exist in the 840s and 850s. Nevertheless, the attack from the Rus' in 860 came as a surprise; it was as sudden and unexpected "as a swarm of wasps", as Photius put it. The empire was struggling to repel the Abbasid advance in Asia Minor. In March 860, the garrison of the key fortress Loulon unexpectedly surrendered to the Arabs. In April or May, both sides exchanged captives, and the hostilities briefly ceased; however, in the beginning of June, Emperor Michael III left Constantinople for Asia Minor to invade the Abbasid Caliphate.

== Siege ==
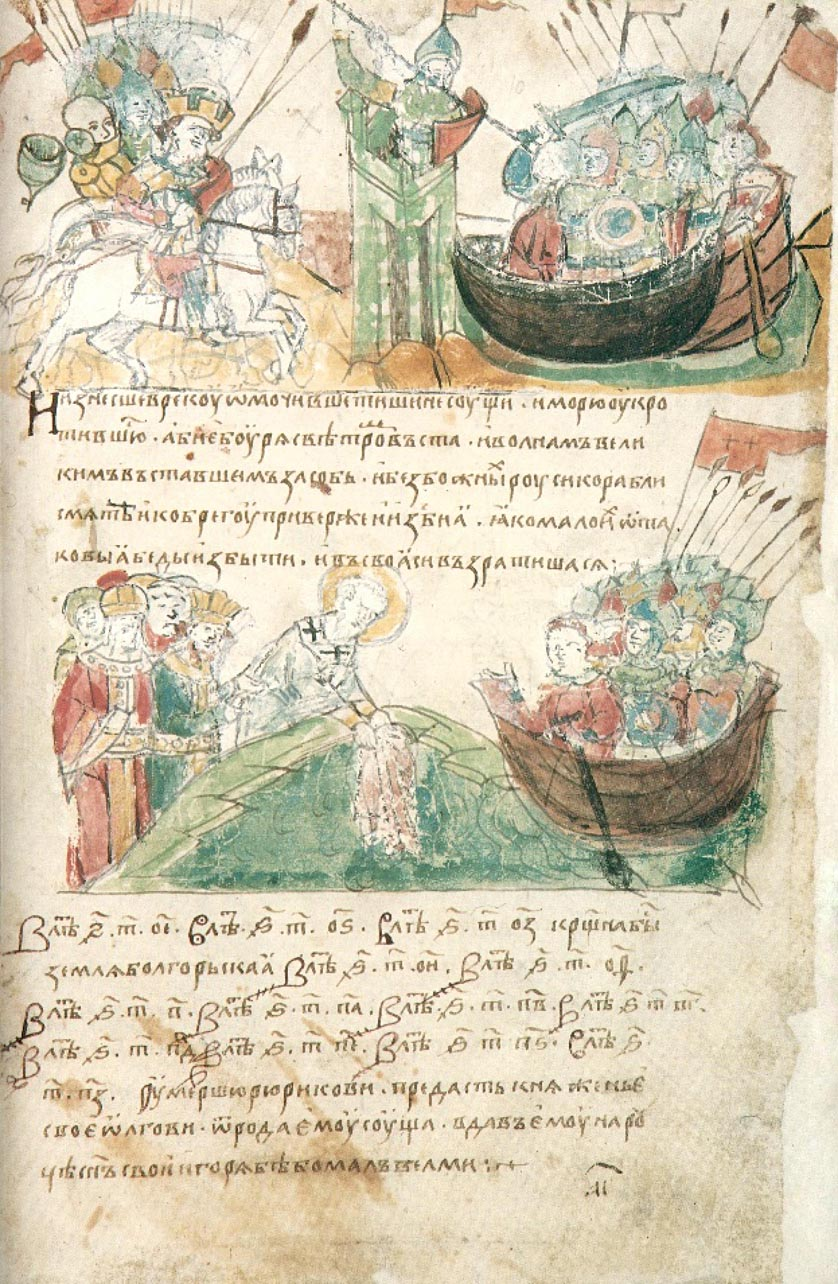
The Rus' lay siege to Constantinople. From the 15th century Radziwiłł Chronicle.

On June 18, 860, (Note: This date, given by the Brussels Chronicle, is nowadays accepted as definitive by historians. In the 12th century Primary Chronicle of Kievan Rus', the campaign is dated to 866 and associated with the names of the Askold and Dir, believed to be the Kievan rulers at the time. However, the dating in the early part of the Primary Chronicle is generally faulty. (Vasiliev 145)) at sunset, a fleet of about 200 Rus' vessels (Note: Contradicting the Greek sources, John the Deacon puts the number of ships at 360. This divergence has led Alexander Vasiliev to argue that John wrote about an entirely different event — a Viking attack on Constantinople from the south in 861, otherwise not attested by any other source (Vasiliev 25). The Primary Chronicle gives an even more exaggerated number of ships — 2,000. (Logan 188)) sailed into the Bosporus and started pillaging the suburbs of Constantinople (Old East Slavic: Tsarigrad, Old Norse: Miklagarðr). The attackers set homes on fire, drowning and stabbing the residents. Unable to do anything to repel the invaders, Patriarch Photius urged his flock to implore the Theotokos to save the city. Having devastated the suburbs, the Rus' passed into the Sea of Marmara and fell upon the Isles of the Princes, where the former patriarch Ignatius of Constantinople was living in exile. The Rus' plundered the dwellings and the monasteries, slaughtering those they captured. They took twenty-two of the patriarch's servants aboard a ship and dismembered them with axes.

The attack took the Byzantines by surprise, "like a thunderbolt from heaven", as it was put by Patriarch Photius in his famous oration written on the occasion. Emperor Michael III was absent from the city, as was his navy, which was dreaded for its skill in using Greek fire. The imperial army, including troops normally garrisoned closest to the capital, was fighting the Arabs in Asia Minor. The city's land defences were weakened by this. The sea defences were also lacking as the Byzantine Navy was occupied fighting Arabs in the Aegean Sea and the Mediterranean Sea. These simultaneous deployments left the coasts and islands of the Black Sea, the Bosporus, and the Sea of Marmara susceptible to attack.

The invasion continued until August 4, when, in another of his sermons, Photius thanked heaven for miraculously relieving the city from such a dire threat. The writings of Photius provide the earliest example of the name "Rus" (Rhos, Greek: Ῥῶς) being mentioned in a Greek source; previously the dwellers of the lands to the north of the Black Sea were referred to archaically as "Tauroscythians". The patriarch reported that they had no supreme ruler and lived in some distant northern lands. Photius called them ἔθνος ἄγνωστον, "unknown people", although some historians prefer to translate the phrase as "obscure people", pointing out the earlier contacts between Byzantines and the Rus'.

== Later traditions ==
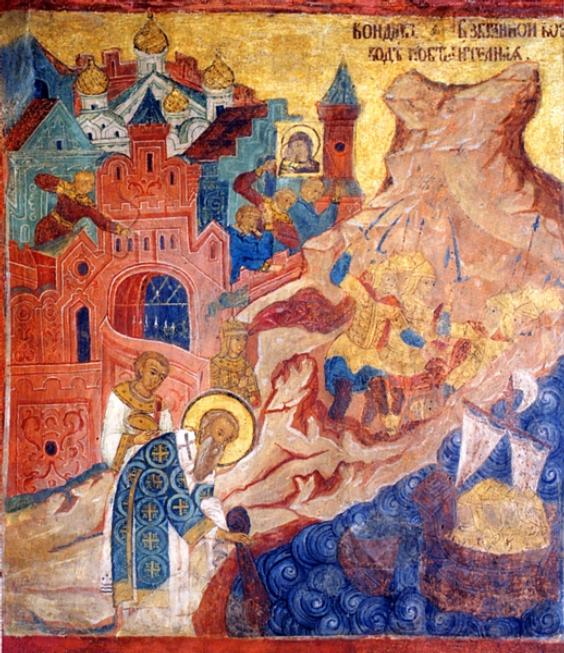
Fresco (1644) showing Michael and Photius putting the veil of the Theotokos into the sea (Church of the Veil, Moscow Kremlin).

The sermons of Photius offer no clue as to the outcome of the invasion or the reasons why the Rus' withdrew. Later sources attribute their retreat to the Emperor's speedy return. As the story goes, after Michael and Photius put the veil of the Theotokos into the sea, there arose a tempest which dispersed the boats of the barbarians. In later centuries, it was said that the Emperor hurried to the church at Blachernae and had the robe of the Theotokos carried in procession along the Theodosian Walls. This precious Byzantine relic was dipped symbolically into the sea and a great wind immediately arose and wrecked the Rus' ships. The pious legend was recorded by George Hamartolus, whose manuscript was an important source for the Primary Chronicle. The authors of the chronicle appended the names of Askold and Dir to the account as they believed that these two Varangians had presided over Kiev in 866. It was to this year that (through some quirk in chronology) they attributed the first Rus' expedition against the Byzantine capital.

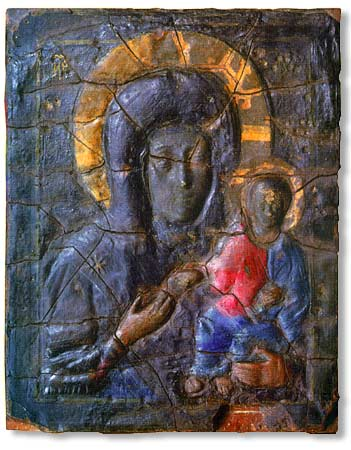
The Blachernitissa: the icon before which Michael III may have prayed to the Theotokos for the deliverance of Constantinople from the Rus'.

Nestor's account of the first encounter between the Rus' and the Byzantines may have contributed to the popularity of the Theotokos in Russia. The miraculous saving of Constantinople from the barbarian hordes would appear in Russian icon-painting, without understanding that the hordes in question may have issued from Kiev. Furthermore, when the Blachernitissa was brought to Moscow in the 17th century, it was said that it was this icon that had saved Tsargrad from the troops of the "Scythian khagan", after Michael III had prayed before it to the Theotokos. Nobody noticed that the story had obvious parallels with the sequence of events described by Nestor.

In the 9th century, a legend sprang up to the effect that an ancient column at the Forum of Taurus had an inscription predicting that Constantinople would be conquered by the Rus. This legend, well known in Byzantine literature, was revived by the Slavophiles in the 19th century, when Russia was on the point of wresting the city from the Ottomans.

== Criticism ==
As was demonstrated by Oleg Tvorogov and Constantine Zuckerman, among others, the 9th century and later sources are out of tune with the earliest records of the event. In his August sermon, Photius mentions neither Michael III's return to the capital nor the miracle with the veil (of which the author purportedly was a participant).

On the other hand, Pope Nicholas I, in a letter sent to Michael III on September 28, 865, mentions that the suburbs of the imperial capital were recently raided by the pagans who were allowed to retreat without any punishment. The Venetian Chronicle of John the Deacon reports that the Normanorum gentes, having devastated the suburbanum of Constantinople, returned to their own lands in triumph ("et sic praedicta gens cum triumpho ad propriam regressa est").

It appears that the victory of Michael III over the Rus' was invented by the Byzantine historians in the mid-9th century or later and became generally accepted in the Slavic chronicles influenced by them. However, the memory of the successful campaign was transmitted orally among the Kievans and may have dictated Nestor's account of Oleg's 907 campaign, which is not recorded in Byzantine sources at all.

== Notes and references ==
=== Sources ===
- Egorshina, O.; Petrova, A. (2023). История русской армии [The history of the Russian Army] (in Russian). Moscow: Edition of the Russian Imperial Library. ISBN 978-5-699-42397-2.
- Pashuto, Vladimir (1968). Внешняя политика Руси [The foreign policy of Russia] (in Russian). Наука.
- Iohannes Diaconus. Chronicon. Rome: Monticolo, Cronache veneziane antichissime
- Leo Grammaticus. Corpus Scriptorum Historiae Byzantinae. Bonn, 1842.
- Logan, F. Donald. The Vikings in History, 2nd ed. Routledge, 1992. ISBN 0-415-08396-6
- Nicolai I. Papae epistolae. Ed. in: Monumenta Germaniae Hictorica. Epistolae VI. (Karolini eavi IV). Berlin, 1925
- Symeon Logothetes. Chronicon. Bonn, 1838.
- Theodose de Melitene. Chronographia. Munich, 1859.
- Harris, Jonathan, Constantinople: Capital of Byzantium. Hambledon/Continuum, London, 2007. ISBN 978-1-84725-179-4
- Sverrir Jakobsson, The Varangians: In God’s Holy Fire Archived 2021-04-18 at the Wayback Machine (Palgrave Macmillan, 2020), pp. 23–34. ISBN 978-3-030-53797-5
- Turnbull, Stephen. The Walls of Constantinople, AD 324–1453, Osprey Publishing, ISBN 1-84176-759-X
- Tvorogov, Oleg. "Skol'ko raz khodili na Konstantinopol Askold i Dir?" Slavyanovedeniya, 1992. 2
- Vasiliev, Alexander. The Russian Attack on Constantinople in 860. Cambridge Mass., 1925
- Uspensky, Fyodor. The History of the Byzantine Empire, vol. 2. Moscow: Mysl, 1997
- Zuckerman, Constantine. Deux étapes de la formation de l’ancien état russe, in Les centres proto-urbains russes entre Scandinavie, Byzance et Orient. Actes du Colloque International tenu au Collège de France en octobre 1997, ed. M. Kazanski, A. Nersessian & C. Zuckerman (Réalités byzantines 7), Paris 2000, pp. 95–120.
- Gumilev, Lev (2023) [1996]. От Руси к России [For Rus' to Russia]. Эксклюзивная классика (in Russian) (revised ed.). Moscow: AST. ISBN 978-5-17-153845-3.

== See also ==
- List of wars involving Russia
