= Life of Andrew the Fool =

Byzantine hagiography text concerning Andrew of Constantinople

The Life of Andrew the Fool is a Byzantine hagiography text concerning Andrew of Constantinople. The text was very popular during the Byzantine era, with 30 manuscripts dated between the 10th to the 16th century, and in the post-Byzantine period, 82 Greek copies between the 16th to the 19th century.

== Description ==
Over 110 complete and fragmentary Greek manuscripts containing various editions of the Life have survived, with the oldest being a fragment of a manuscript dating to the second half of the 10th century. The Life says that Andrew lived during the time of Leo I (r. 457–474). However, some historians believe he lived in the 9th to 10th centuries, during the reign of Leo VI (r. 886–912), due to anachronisms in the text and similarities to the lives of other holy fools, including Simeon the Holy Fool and Basil the Younger. The first publisher of the Life, the Bollandist K. Janning, dated its composition to the 10th century and placed Andrew's life in the reign of Leo VI.

== Legacy ==
The Life was widely disseminated in Russian literature, with the account of Andrew's vision of the Holy Mother of God serving as the basis for a new Russian feast by Andrey Bogolyubsky in the 1160s. The first translation to Old Russian was completed in the late 11th or early 12th century. More than 200 copies of this translation are known, with the oldest complete copy dating to a 14th-century manuscript. No later than the 14th century, a new translation of the Life was completed by the South Slavs, likely Serbs.

== Bibliography ==
- Ivanov, Sergey A.; Franklin, Simon (2006). Holy Fools in Byzantium and Beyond. Oxford University Press. ISBN 9780199272518.
- Krueger, Derek (1996). Symeon the Holy Fool: Leontius's Life and the Late Antique City. University of California Press. ISBN 9780520089112.
- Nikiforova, A. Yu.; Pivovarova, N. V. (2001). "Андрей Юродивый". Православная энциклопедия — Т. II: Алексий, человек Божий — Анфим Анхиальский. Православная энциклопедия. pp. 391–393. ISBN 5-89572-007-2.
