= Church of St. Mary of Blachernae =

Church of St. Mary of Blachernae Θεοτόκος των Βλαχερνών
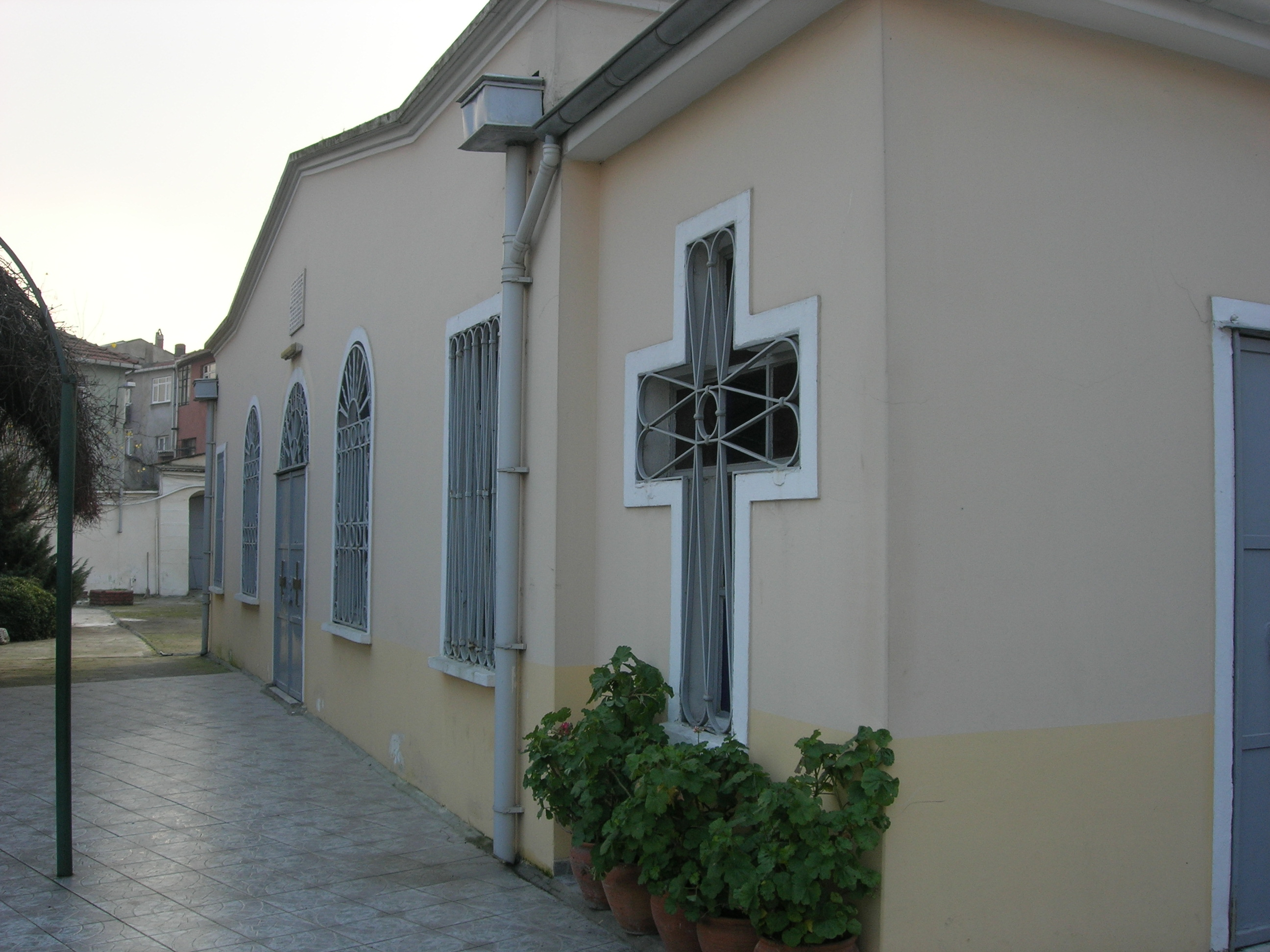
- The modern church viewed from north

- Location in the district of Fatih in Istanbul
- 41.0383°N 28.9425°E
- Location: Ayvansaray, Istanbul
- Country: Turkey
- Denomination: Greek Orthodox

History
- Founded: 450
- Founder: Aelia Pulcheria
- Dedication: Theotokos ton Blachernon

Architecture
- Completed: 1867

The Church of Saint Mary of Blachernae (full name in Greek: Θεοτόκος των Βλαχερνών (pr. Theotókos ton Vlachernón); Turkish name: Meryem Ana Kilisesi) is an Eastern Orthodox church in Mustafa Paşa Bostanı Sokak in Ayvansaray in the Fatih district of Istanbul, just inside the old walled city. During the latter part of the Byzantine period, the original church complex on the site was one of the most important sanctuaries of Byzantium, arguably outstripping Hagia Sophia in importance due to its proximity to the Palace of the Blachernae. The Byzantine church complex was destroyed in 1434, and in the nineteenth century a small new church was built on the site. Today it is protected by a high wall, and fronted by a garden.

== History ==
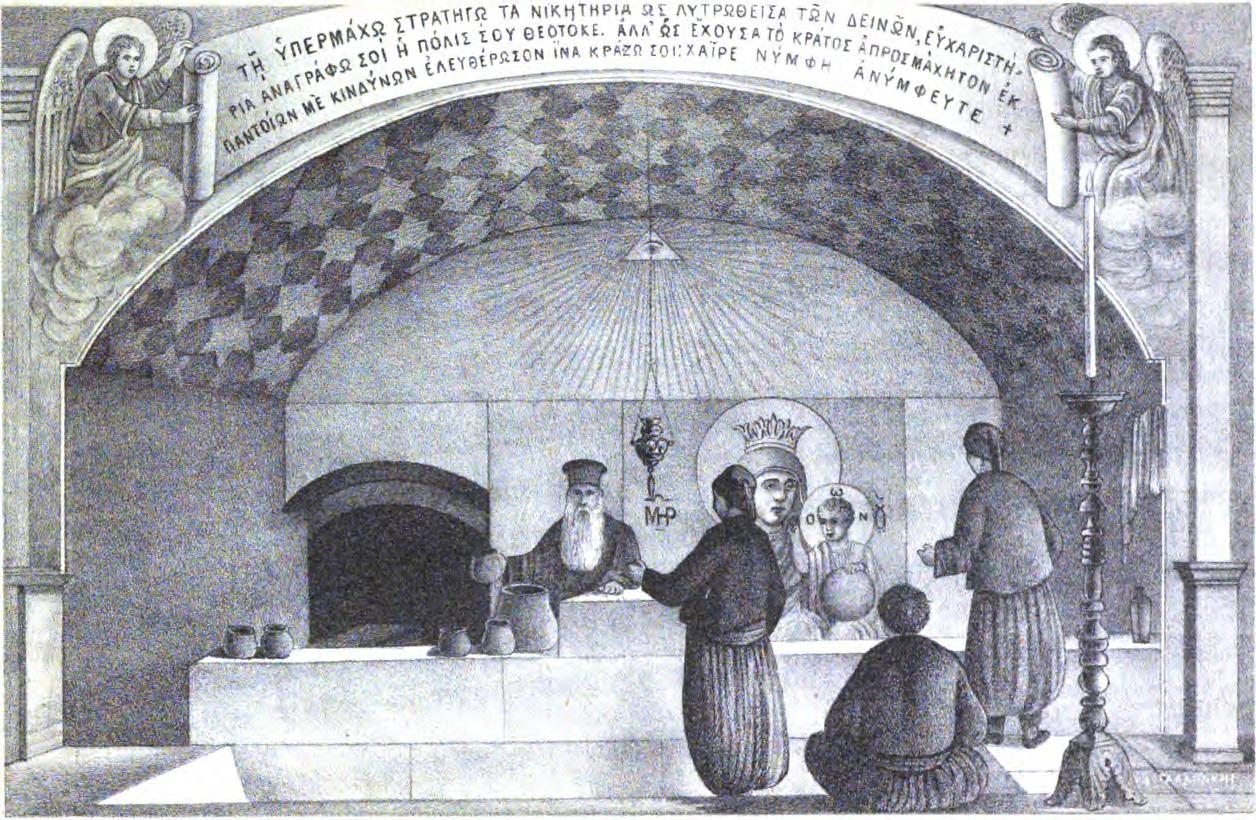
The Hagiasma of Blachernae in a drawing of 1877, from A.G. Paspates' Byzantine topographical studies

In 450, Empress Aelia Pulcheria began to construct a church near an ayazma or holy water spring situated outside the walls of Theodosius II at the foot of the sixth hill of Constantinople. After her death in 453, the shrine was completed by her husband, Emperor Marcian.

Emperor Leo I erected two other buildings near the church: a parekklesion, named Ayía Sorós (holy reliquary) because it hosted the holy mantle and robe of the Virgin brought from Palestine in 473, and the ´Ayion Loúsma (sacred bath) building, which enclosed the spring.

During the first quarter of the 6th century, Emperors Justin I and Justinian I restored and enlarged the church.

The growing importance of the complex encouraged the Emperors to move to the surrounding area and start building what would become the imperial Palace of Blachernae. Skarlatos Byzantios, in his influential work called "Constantinople", mentions the original Greek tradition that the district was named after the fish species called "Lakernai" in Latin, which the locals fished there in large quantities and called "Blachernai". According to a Romanian author, Ilie Gherghel, the name may derive from an old term used for the Romanians (Vlach, Blac, etc.) and from a small colony of Vlachs.

The church contained a famous icon of the Virgin, the Vlachernítissa, named after the church. It was painted on wood and decorated with gold and silver. The Byzantines considered this icon and the relics of the Virgin kept in the parekklesion to be extremely powerful at a time of war or natural disaster. The first proof of their power came in 626 when Constantinople was besieged by the combined armies of the Avars and the Persians at a time when Emperor Heraclius was away fighting the Persians in Mesopotamia. His son Constantine, the Patriarch Sergius and Patrician Bonus carried the icon along the ramparts and shortly afterwards the Avar army was destroyed. The Khan of the Avars said afterwards that he had been frightened by the vision of a jewel-bedecked woman walking along the walls.

At the end of the siege, the Byzantines learned that the church (which at that time lay outside the Walls) was the only one not to have been plundered by the invaders. When the victorious Heraclius returned to Constantinople, bringing back the True Cross which had been captured by the Persians in Jerusalem, the Patriarch received him at Saint Mary's. Sometime later, the Emperor built a single wall to protect the church, thus enclosing the suburb of Blachernae within the city.

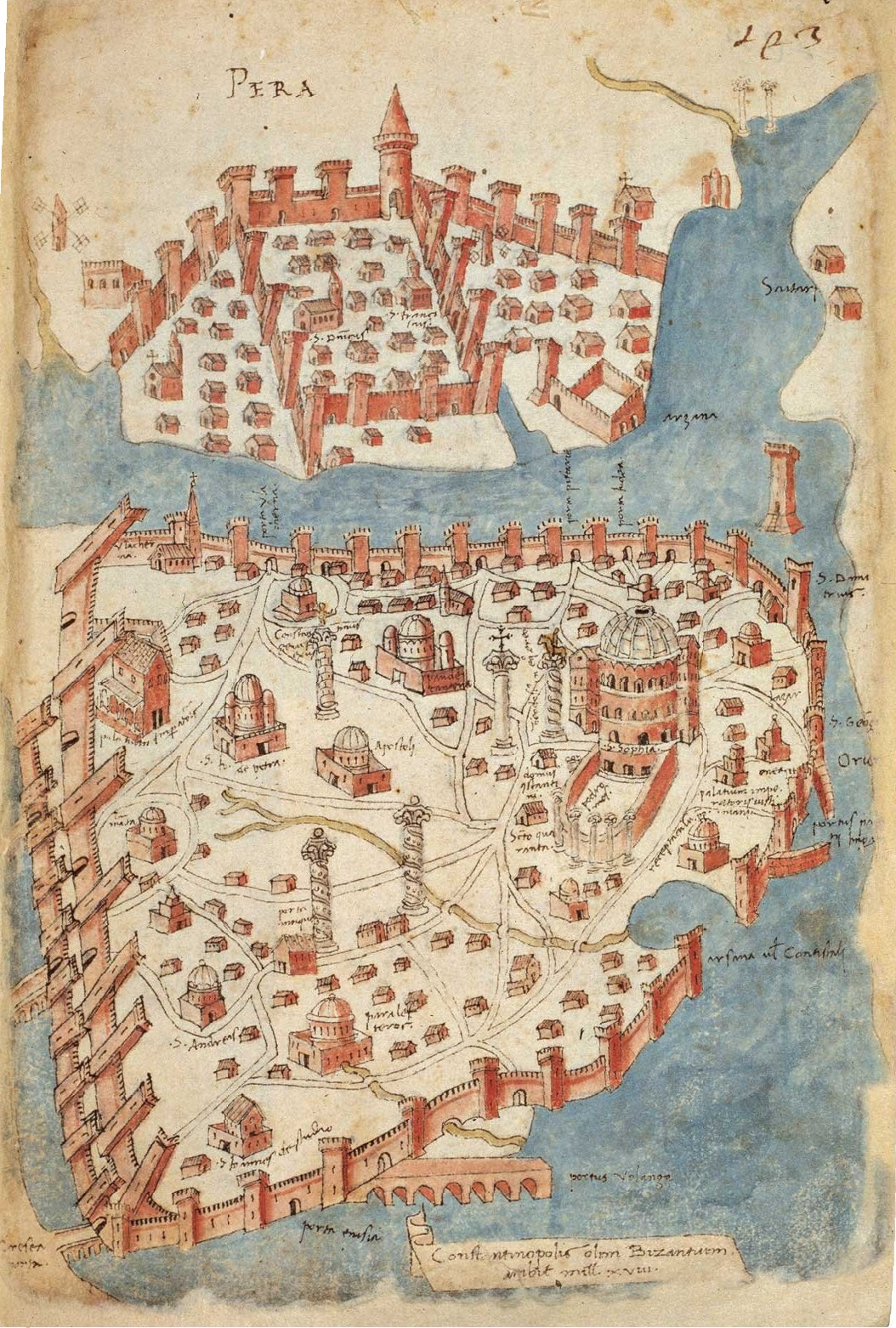
Map of Constantinople around 1420, after Cristoforo Buondelmonti. The District of Blachernae can be seen on the center left part of the map, surrounded on two sides by the walls of the city, below the Golden Horn.

The Byzantine victory during the Arab siege of 717-718 was also credited to the protection of the Virgin Vlachernitissa, as was the Byzantine victory against the invasion of the Rus in 860. On the latter occasion, the Veil of the Virgin (mafórion), which had joined the other relics in the church, was plunged into the sea to invoke God's protection for the fleet. In 926 during the war against Simeon of Bulgaria the potency of the relics of the Virgin also helped convince the Bulgarian Tsar to negotiate with the Byzantines rather than assault the city. In the early 10th century, a procession took place every Friday in which these relics were brought to the church of Chalkoprateia, near the Hagia Sophia.

On 15 August 944 the church received two more important relics: the letter written by King Abgar V of Edessa to Jesus and the Mandylion. Both were subsequently moved to the Church of the Virgin of the Pharos.

As a centre for the veneration of images, the Church of St Mary also played an important role in Byzantine religious disputes. During the Iconoclastic period, the final session of the Council of Hieria, at which the cult of the images was condemned, took place in the church. As a consequence of that decision, Emperor Constantine V ordered its figurative mosaics to be destroyed, and replaced them with others representing natural scenes with trees, birds and animals. On that occasion the Icon of the Blachernitissa was hidden under a layer of silvery mortar. In 843, with the end of Iconoclasm, the Feast of Orthodoxy was celebrated for the first time in the church of Blachernae with an Agrypnía ("holy Vigil"), which occurred on the first Sunday of Lent. Thomais of Lesbos, a laywoman who was later considered a saint, frequented the church regularly in the 10th century and prayed before the Ayía Sorós (where lay people were not allowed).

The Blachernitissa was discovered again during restoration works executed during the reign of Romanos III Argyros in the early 11th century and once again became one of Constantinople's most venerated icons. The Church of Saint Mary was completely destroyed during a fire in 1070, but was rebuilt by Romanos IV Diogenes and Michael VII Doukas to the same plan.

According to Anna Komnene, the Icon of the Virgin Vlachernitissa in the church underwent what became known as the "habitual miracle" (Greek: to synetís thavma). On Friday after sunset, when the church was empty, the veil which covered the icon slowly rose, revealing the face of the Virgin, while twenty-four hours later it slowly fell again. The miracle did not occur regularly, and ceased completely after the Latin conquest of the city.

After the Latin invasion of 1204, the church was occupied by the Latin clergy and placed directly under the Holy See. Before the end of the Latin Empire, John III Doukas Vatatzes redeemed the church and many monasteries for the Orthodox clergy in exchange for money.

On 29 June 1434, some noble children hunting pigeons on the roof of the church accidentally started a fire, which destroyed the whole complex and the surrounding quarter. The area was largely neglected during the Ottoman period. In 1867, the Guild of Orthodox Furriers bought the parcel of land around the holy spring, and built a new small church there.

== Description ==
The religious complex of Blachernae comprised three buildings: The Church of Saint Mary, the Chapel of the reliquary (Ayía Sorós), and the Sacred Bath (´Ayion Loúsma).

The church proper, defined by all the sources as "large" (mégas naós), was of the basilica type, with the space divided into three aisles by two colonnades, like other churches of the early type in Constantinople such as St. John of Stoudios. It had a rectangular plan with sides of 96 metres (310 ft) and 36 metres (120 ft). Justinian appears to have added a dome to the church, since Procopius, in his work De Edificiis, says that both colonnades curved in the middle of the nave to describe a semicircle. Emperor Justin II added the two side arms, giving the ground plan the appearance of a cross. The reconstruction of 1070 may have followed this plan. The Spanish ambassador Ruy Gonzáles de Clavijo, who visited Constantinople in 1402, wrote that the building was divided into three aisles, with the central one higher than the flanking ones. The columns were made of green jasper, while the capitals and the bases of the columns were gilded and carved in white marble. By that time the church no longer had a dome, but instead a multicoloured compartmented ceiling, decorated with golden garlands.

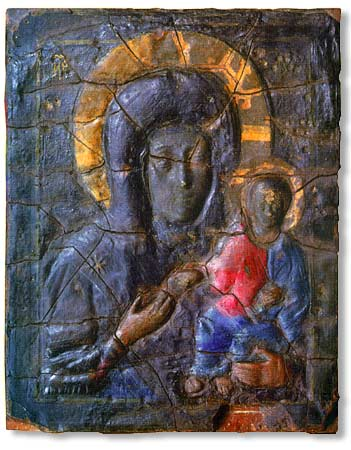
The alleged Vlachernítissa icon of the Theotokos, kept in the Tretyakov Gallery.

The walls at that time were covered with coloured marble panels, while originally a silvery mortar was used. Near the middle of the nave there was a silver ambon, while at the end stood a rich iconostasis covered in images. The upper walls were decorated with mosaics representing the miracles of Christ and episodes of his life up to his Ascension. The church also had tribunes and an oratory. The Imperial Palace of Blachernae - lying further up the slope of the hill - overlooked the church and was connected to it through a porticus and a stairway.

To the right of the church stood the circular parekklísion of the Ayía Sorós, which contained the dress and robe of the Virgin. The veil and a part of her belt (now at Vatopedi monastery on Mount Athos), were also kept there later. The building had a narthex and tribunes. An icon of the Virgin donated by Emperor Leo I and his wife Verina was also venerated there. On its right was kept the casket, adorned with gold and silver, which contained the relics. They were rescued from the Latin occupiers in 1204, and kept in the church after the restoration of the Empire, only to be destroyed during the fire of 1434.

To the right of the parekklesion and connected to it by a door was the bath where the Emperor immersed himself. It was made up of three parts: the robing room where he undressed, the kólymbos (pool for immersion) and the hall of Saint Photinos. Adorned with icons, the kolymbos consisted of a large room surmounted by a dome with the pool in the middle; water flowed into the pool from the hands of a marble statue of the Virgin. An image of Saint Photinos decorated the centre of the dome. Each year, on August 15 (the feast of the Dormition), after the adoration of the Mafórion (holy veil) of the Virgin, the Emperor plunged three times into this sacred pool.

The small church which today encloses the ayazma (holy spring) has a trapezoidal plan with a sloping roof, and is adorned with modern icons and frescoes. It is oriented in a northwest–southeast direction. The holy spring, which is believed to have healing powers, is still a popular destination for Orthodox and Muslim pilgrims, who toss coins and hairpins into the pool. Pilgrims can also ritually wash their eyes at a line of taps. Above them a modern palindrome inscription says: "Nípson anomímata mi mónan ópsin" (Greek: "Wash the sins not only the eyes"). The water cascades into an underground gallery, which, according to tradition, links this ayazma with the one in Balıklı on the other side of the city.

The church is run by an episkopos and two papades. Every Friday morning the Akathist Hymn, composed by Patriarch Sergius during the Siege of 626, is sung there.

== Gallery ==
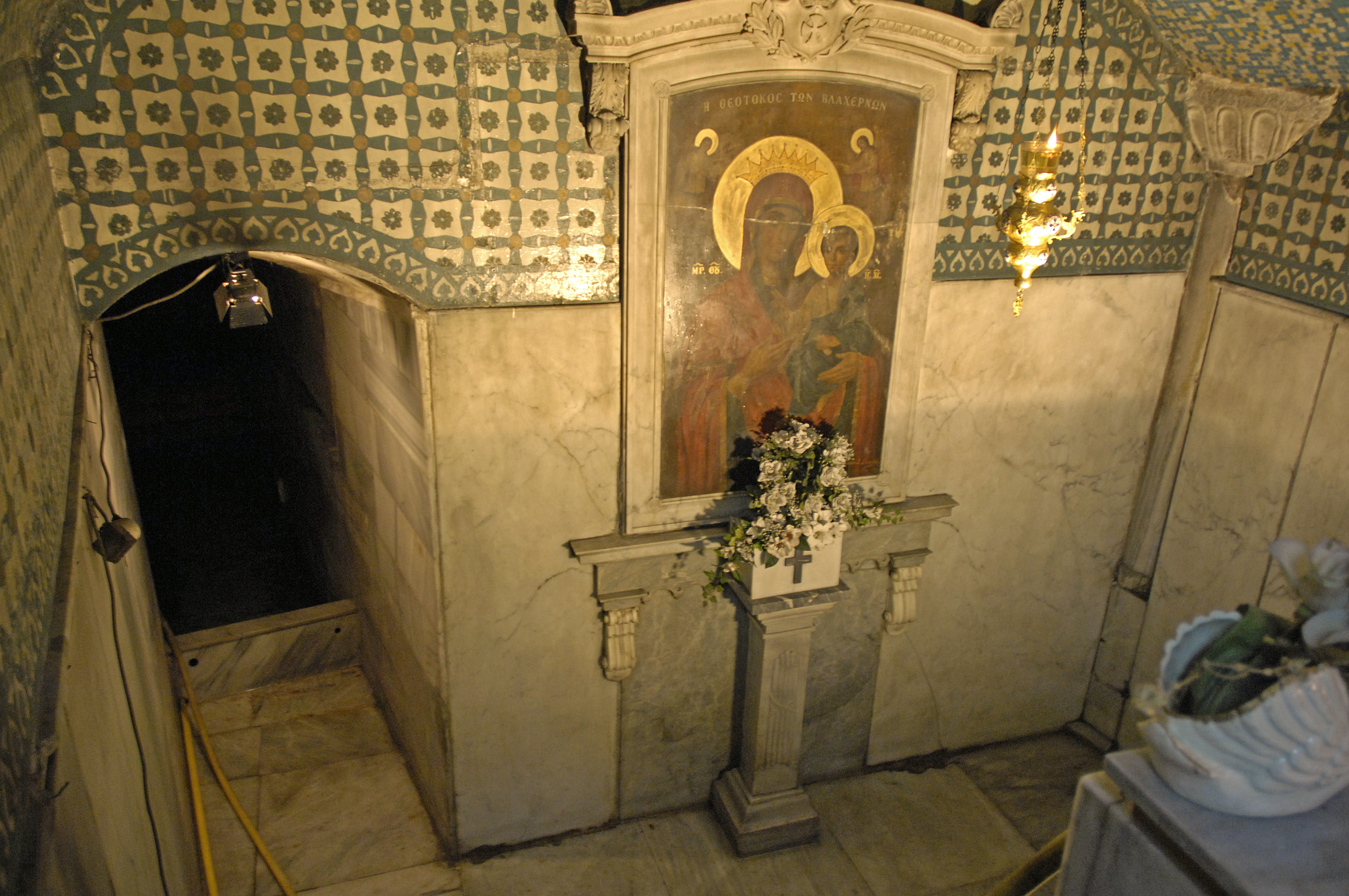
Saint Mary of Blachernae sacred bath

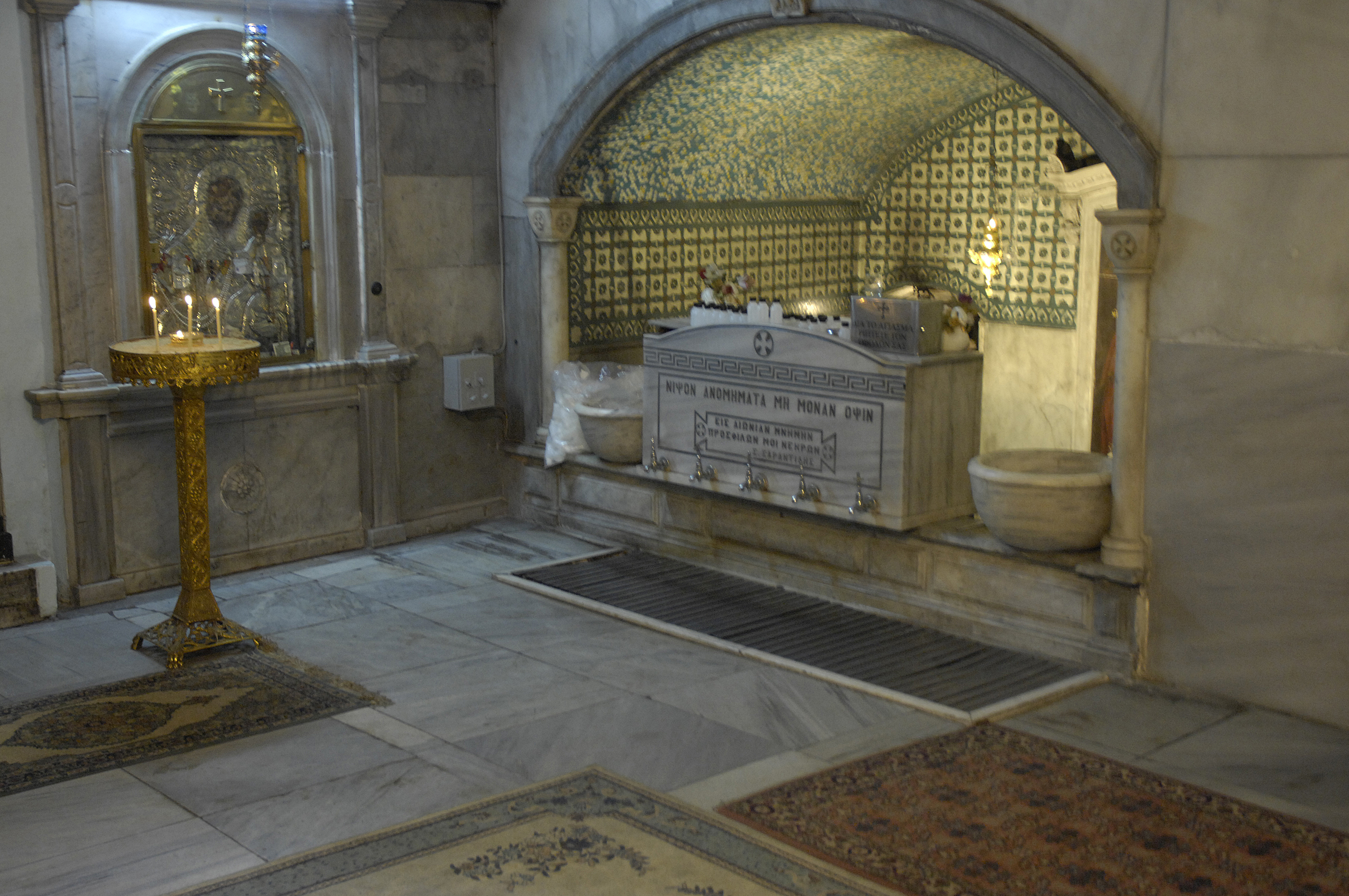
Saint Mary of Blachernae sacred bath

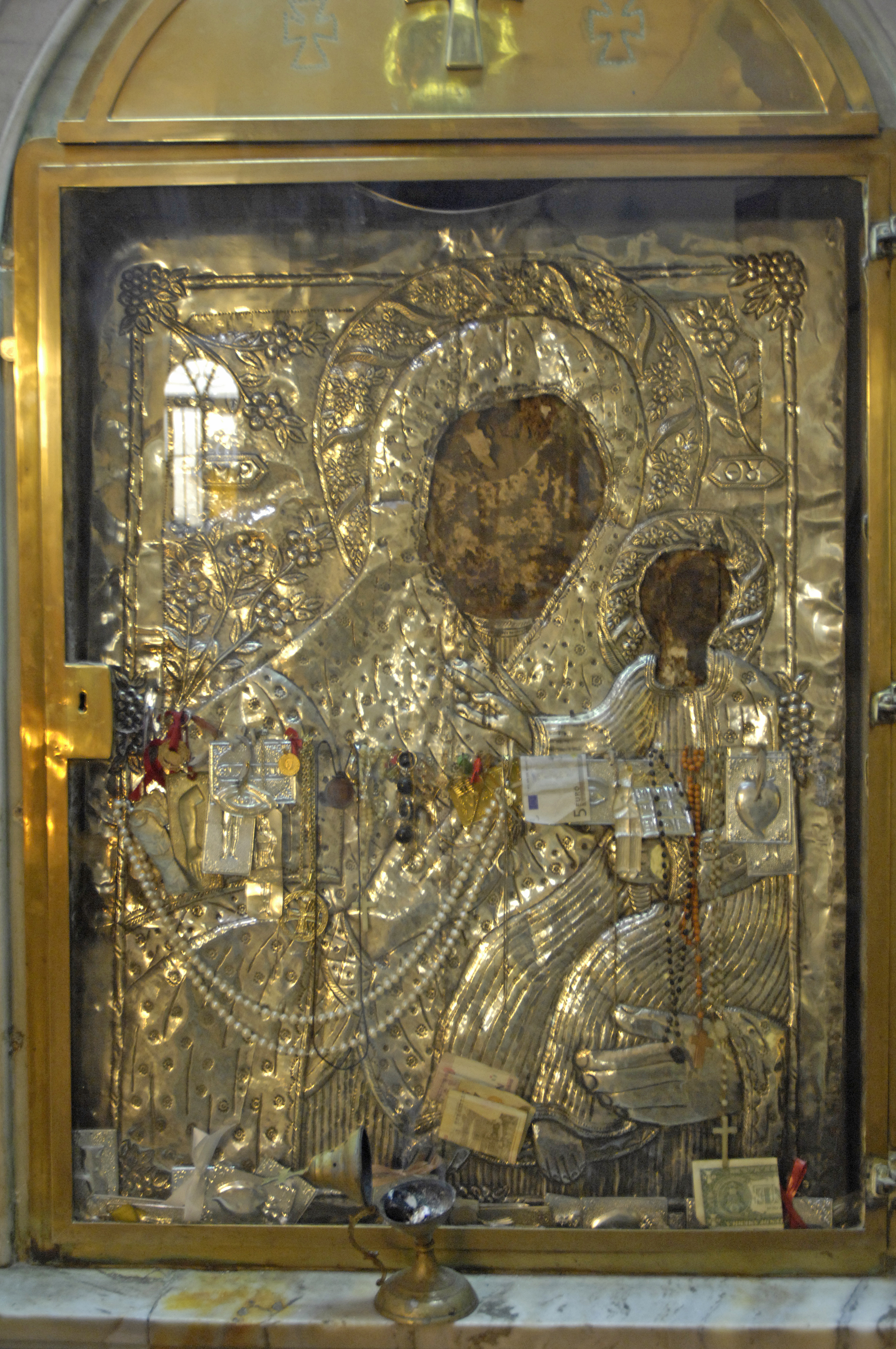
Saint Mary of Blachernae icon at sacred bath

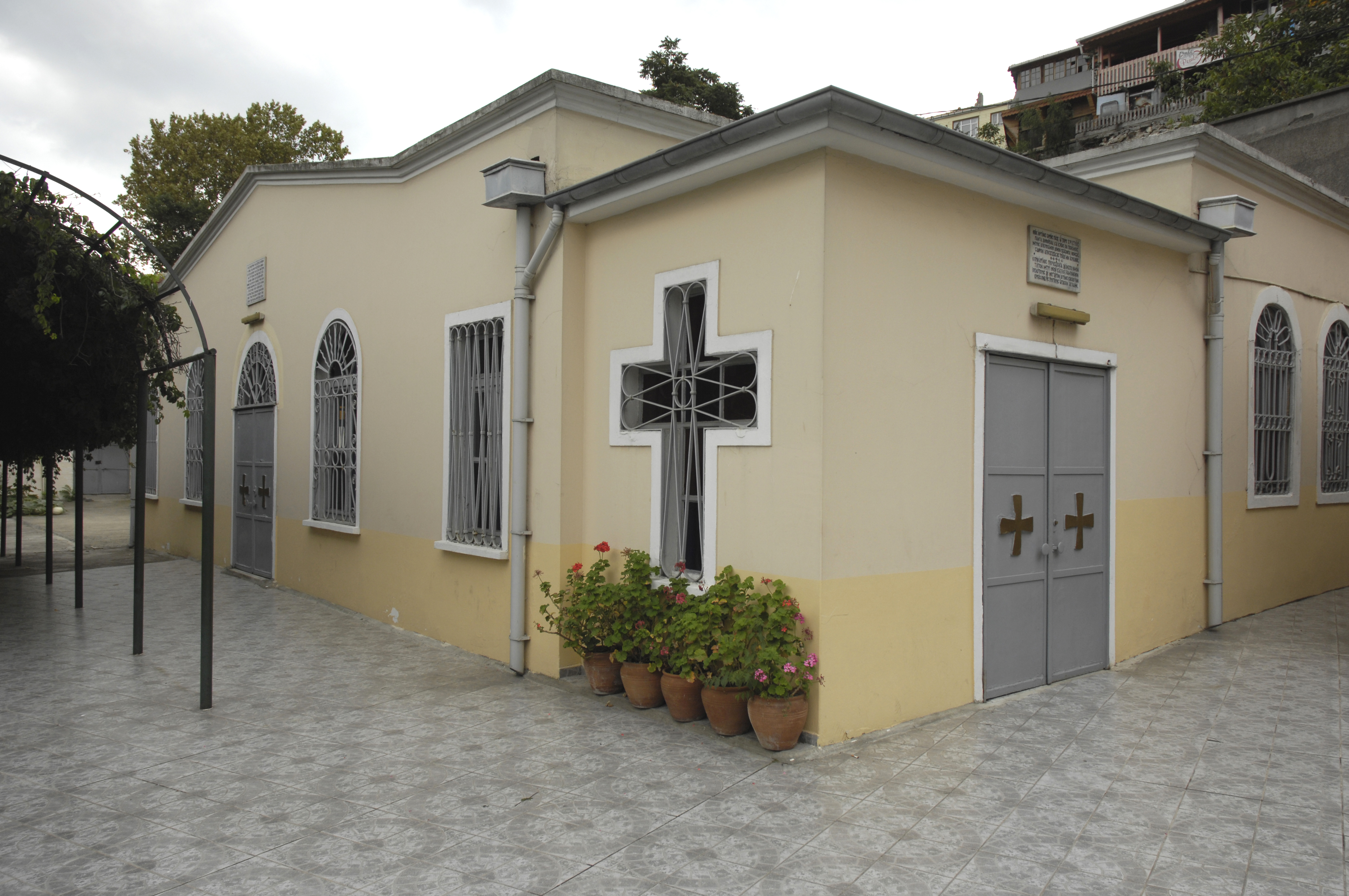
Saint Mary of Blachernae exterior

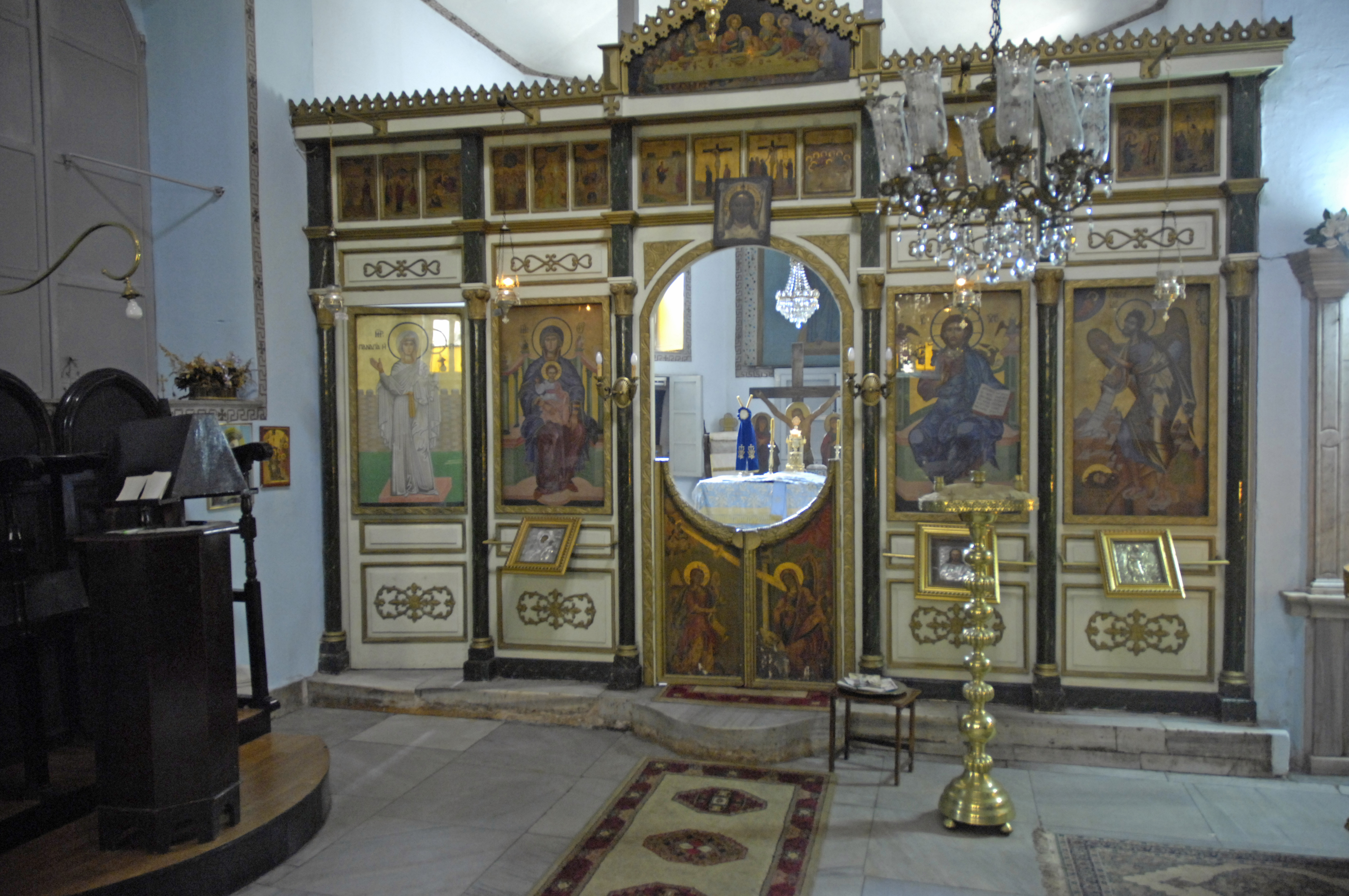
Saint Mary of Blachernae iconostasis

== Sources ==
- Mamboury, Ernest (1953). The Tourists' Istanbul. Istanbul: Çituri Biraderler Basımevi.
- Janin, Raymond (1953). La Géographie ecclésiastique de l'Empire byzantin. 1. Part: Le Siège de Constantinople et le Patriarcat Oecuménique. 3rd Vol. : Les Églises et les Monastères (in French). Paris: Institut Français d'Etudes Byzantines.
- Müller-Wiener, Wolfgang (1977). Bildlexikon Zur Topographie Istanbuls: Byzantion, Konstantinupolis, Istanbul Bis Zum Beginn D. 17 Jh (in German). Tübingen: Wasmuth. ISBN 978-3-8030-1022-3.
- Ronchey, Silvia; Braccini, Tommaso (2010). Il romanzo di Costantinopoli. Guida letteraria alla Roma d'Oriente (in Italian). Torino: Einaudi. ISBN 978-88-06-18921-1.
- Gherghel, Ilie (1920). Cateva consideratiuni la cuprinsul notiunii cuvantului "Vlach" (in Romanian). Bucuresti: Convorbiri literare.
