= Palace of the Porphyrogenitus =

Palace in Istanbul, Türkiye

Coordinates: 41°02′02″N 28°56′25″E

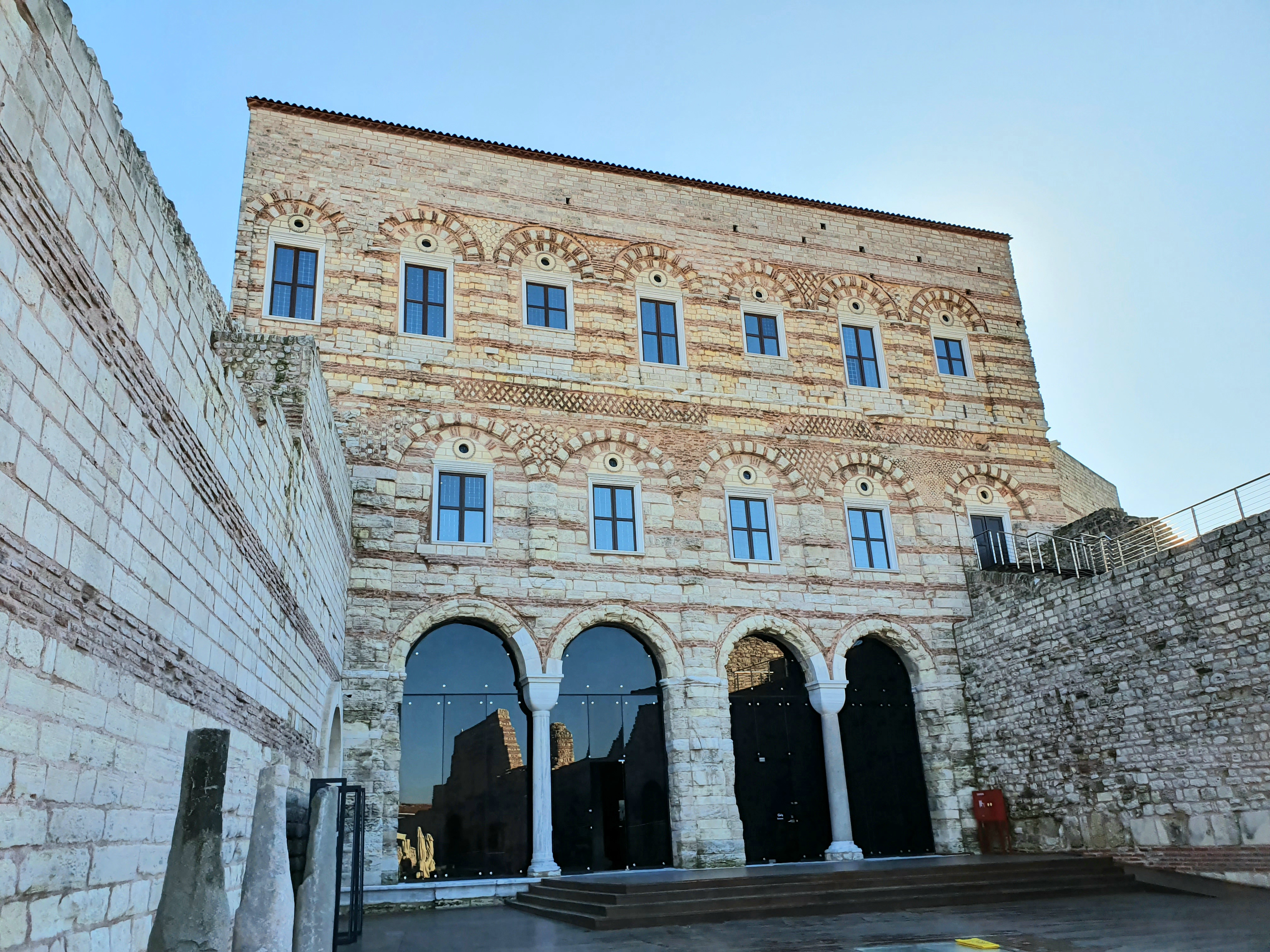
The northern facade of the Palace of the Porphyrogenitus after the modern renovation

The Palace of the Porphyrogenitus (Greek: τὸ Παλάτιον τοῦ Πορφυρογεννήτου), known in Turkish as the Tekfur Sarayı ("Palace of the Sovereign"), is a late 13th-century Byzantine palace in the north-western part of the old city of Constantinople (present-day Istanbul, Turkey). An annex of the greater palace complex of Blachernae, it is the best preserved of the three Byzantine palaces to survive in the city (together with the ruins of the Boukoleon Palace; and the ruins of the Great Palace of Constantinople with its surviving substructures, retrieved mosaics and standing Magnaura section), and one of the few relatively intact examples of late Byzantine secular architecture in the world.

In 2021 it opened to the public as a museum after complete restoration and reroofing. It displays examples of the types of pottery and tiles made in the abandoned palace buildings in the 18th century.

== History ==
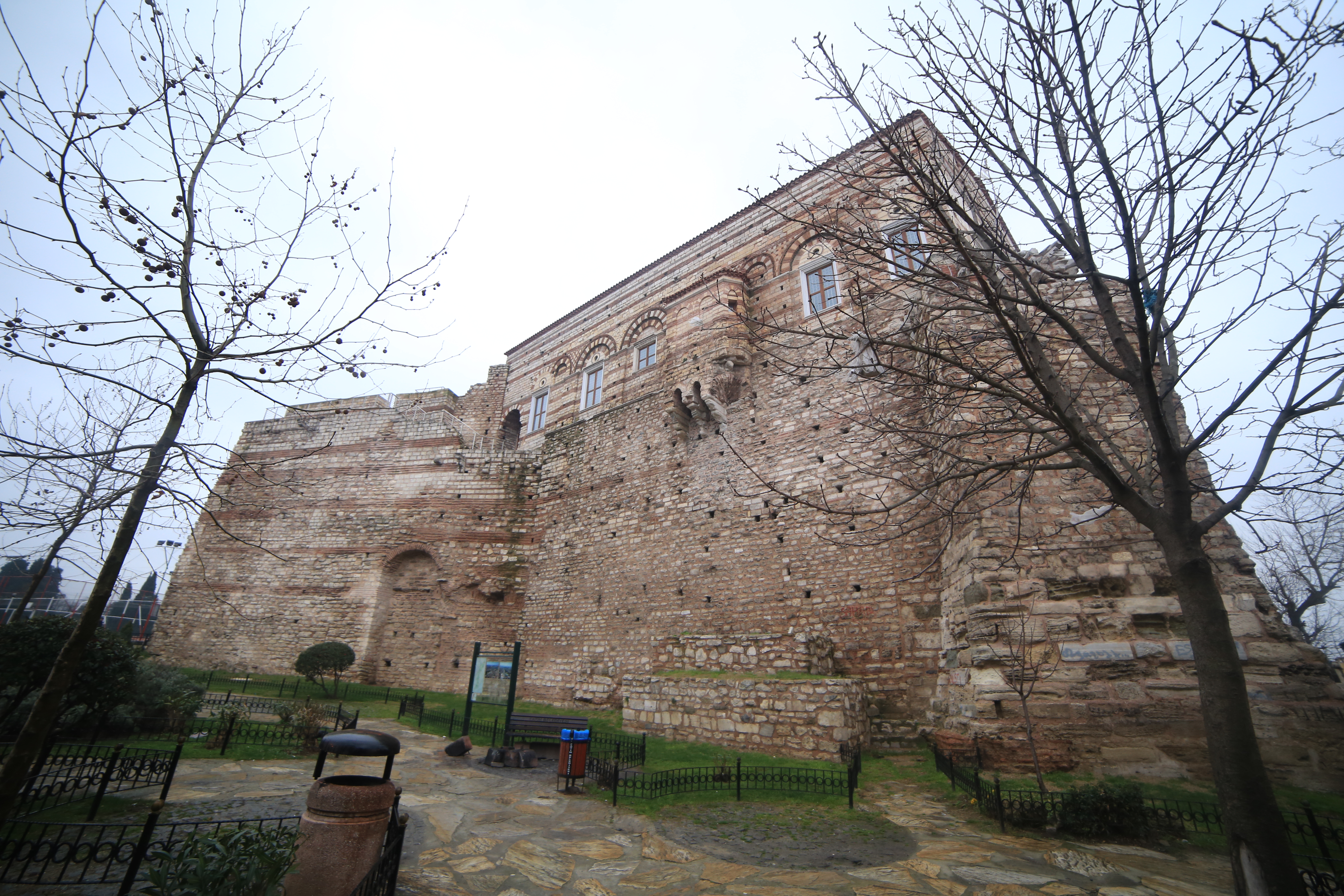
Remains of the chapel (after the restoration)

The Palace was constructed during the late 13th or early 14th centuries as part of the Blachernae palace complex, where the Theodosian Walls join with the later walls of the suburb of Blachernae. The name of the palace is known due to the accounts of the Byzantine historian Michael Critobulus, who described and named the palace during the Ottoman siege of Constantinople in 1453. Although the palace appears at first glance to be named after the 10th-century emperor Constantine VII Porphyrogenitus, it was built long after his time, and is in fact named after Constantine Palaiologos, a son of the Emperor Michael VIII Palaiologos. "Porphyrogenitus", meaning literally "born to the purple", indicated a child born to a reigning emperor. The emperor would show off the newborn heir from the balcony and have them proclaimed “Caesar Orbi”, or “ruler of the world”. The palace also seems to have unintentionally served as a residence for usurpers and emperors in waiting. Andronicus III lived there until his grandfather fully abdicated the throne. At the conclusion of the Byzantine civil war of 1341–1347, John VI Kantakouzenos stayed in the palace while negotiating his regency of John V Palaiologos with Empress Anna of Savoy. The regency ended in another civil war, and John V Palaiologos lived in the palace while completing his removal of John VI Kantakouzenos from power. The palace served as an imperial residence during the final years of the Byzantine Empire.

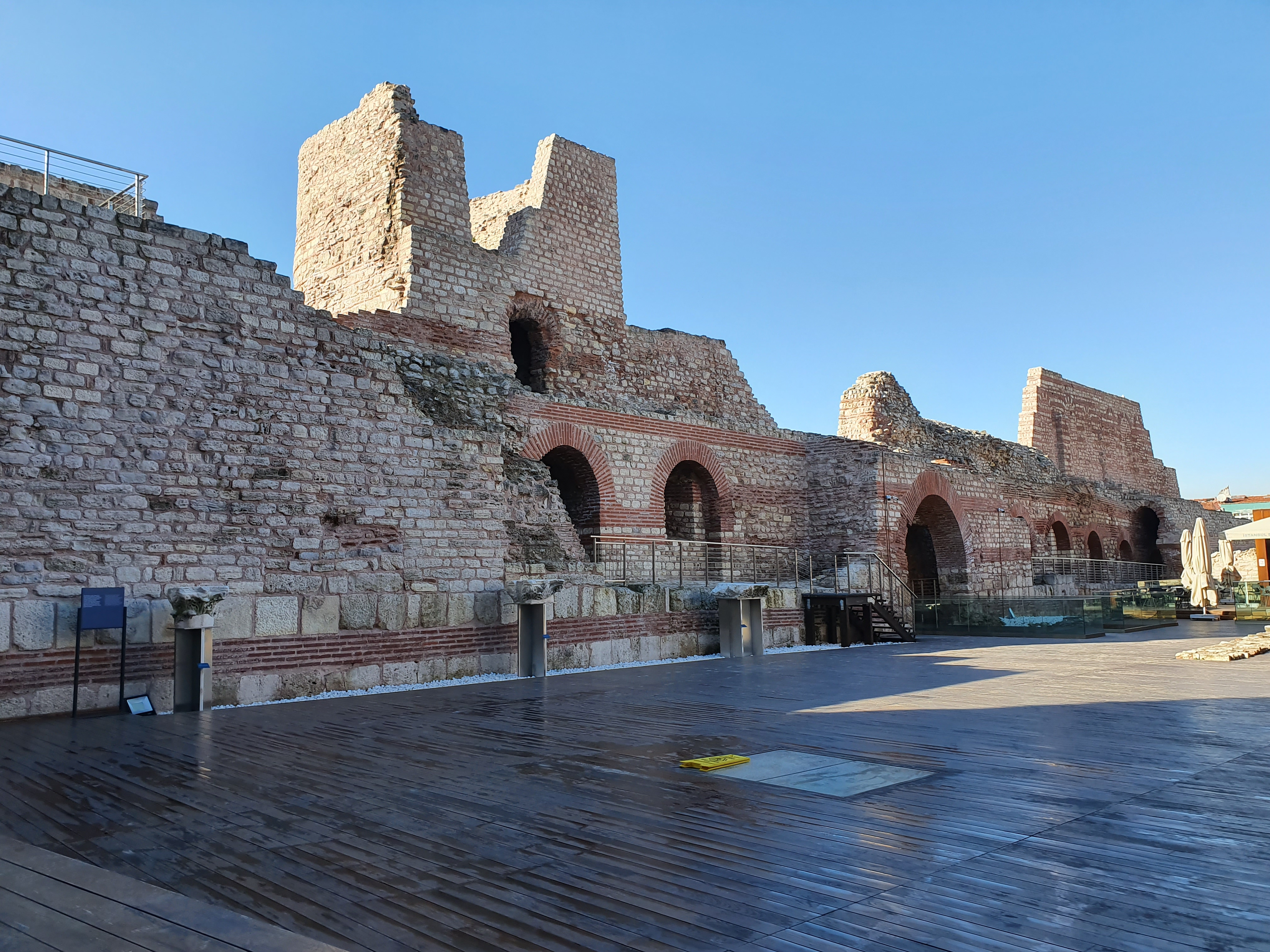
Walls seen from the inner courtyard

The palace suffered extensive damage due to its proximity to the outer walls during the Ottoman conquest of Constantinople in 1453. Afterwards it was used for a wide variety of purposes. During the 16th and 17th century, it housed part of the Sultan's menagerie. The animals were moved elsewhere by the end of the 17th century, and the building was used as a brothel. From 1719, the Tekfur Sarayı pottery workshop was established, and began to produce ceramic tiles in a style similar to that of İznik tiles, but influenced by European designs and colors. The workshop had five kilns and also produced vessels and dishes. It lasted for around a century before going out of business, and by the first half of the 19th century, the building became a poorhouse for Istanbul Jews. In the early 20th century, it was briefly used as a bottle factory, before being abandoned. As a result, only the elaborate brick and stone outer façade survived as one of the few surviving examples of secular Byzantine architecture.

Partial restoration took place in the mid-20th century. In 2010, the palace underwent extensive restoration as part of a four-year citywide reconstruction project. The empty shell of the three-story structure was rebuilt and interior and exterior elevators were added. The building was opened as a museum in 2019.

== Architecture ==
The Palace was a large three-story building located between the inner and outer fortifications of the northern corner of the Theodosian Walls. It is the last remaining part of the late Byzantine Blachernae Palace, and may have served as part of a pavilion. It was built to have three stories, and was positioned between two parts of the city's land fortification walls.

The ground floor features a four-arched arcade, which opens into a courtyard (now used for concerts) overlooked by five large windows on the first floor. The middle level was used for apartments. The top floor of the structure projects above the walls, and has windows on all four sides and served as a large audience hall. On the eastern side is a balcony. The walls are elaborately decorated in geometric designs using red brick and white marble typical of the late Byzantine period.

== Gallery ==
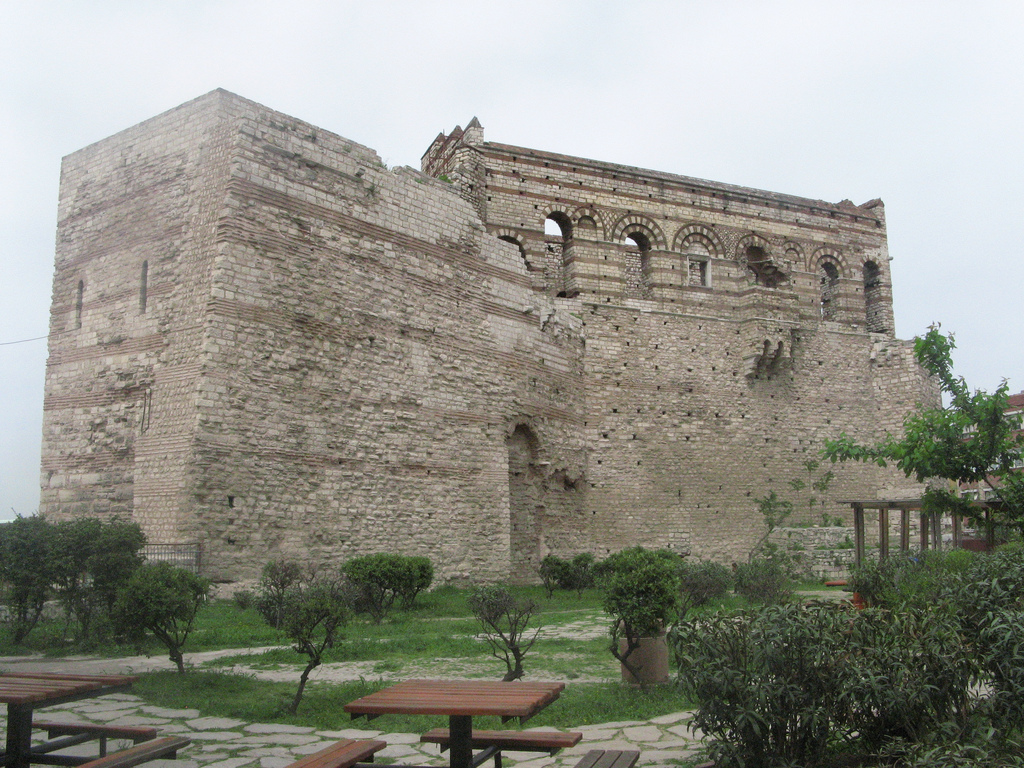
Remains of the chapel (southern wall, before the restoration)

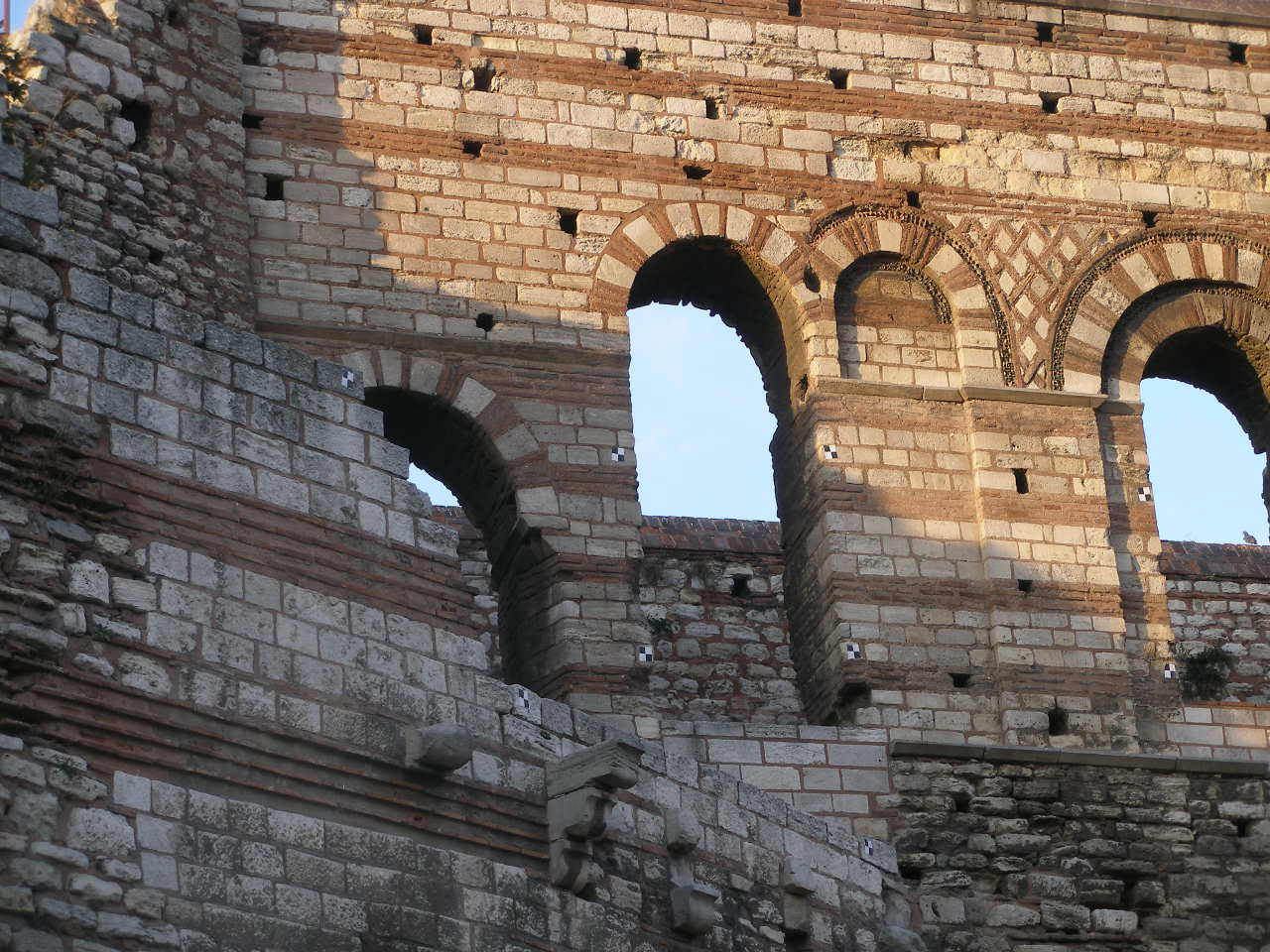
Details of marble decoration (southern wall, before the restoration)

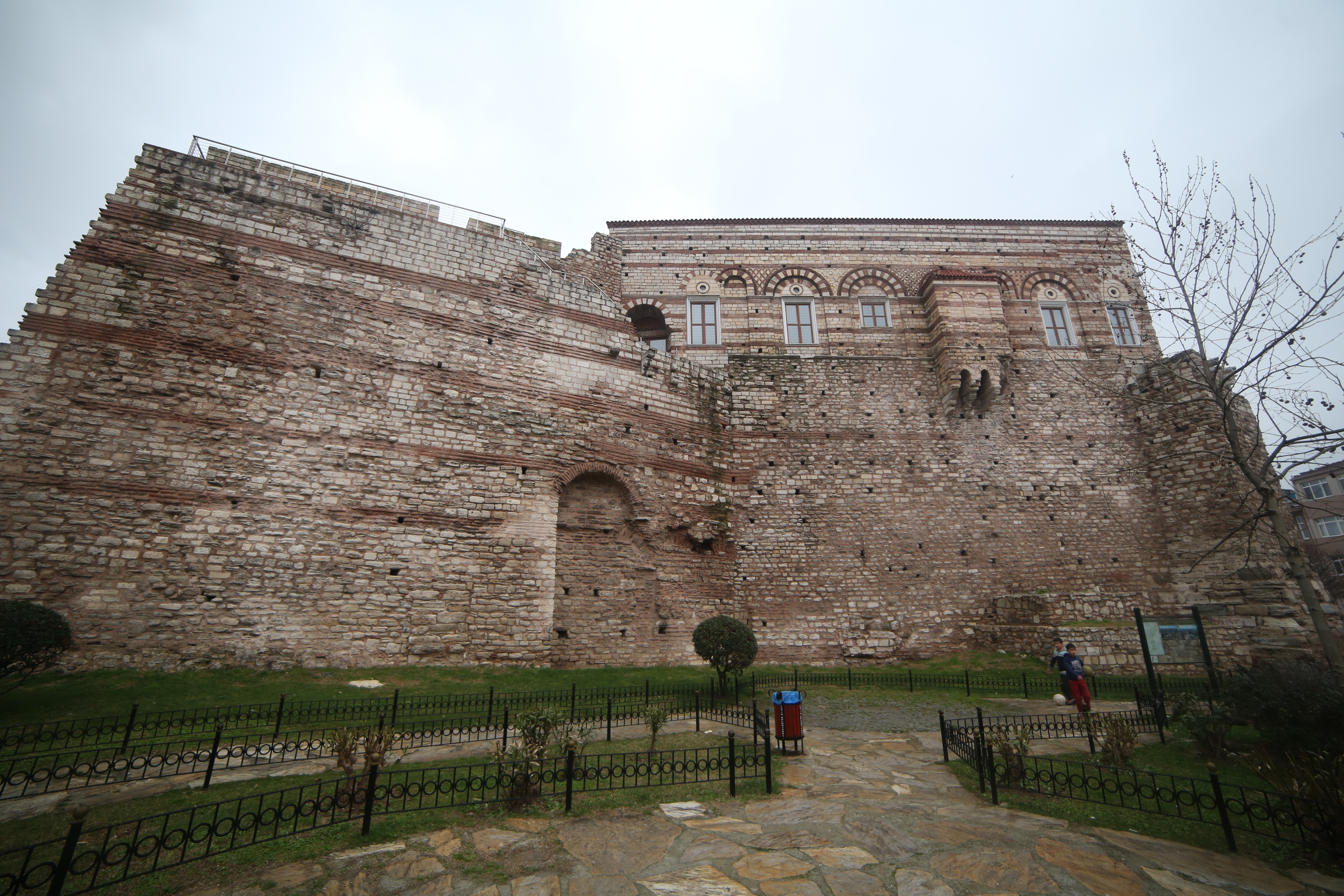
Remains of the chapel (after the restoration)

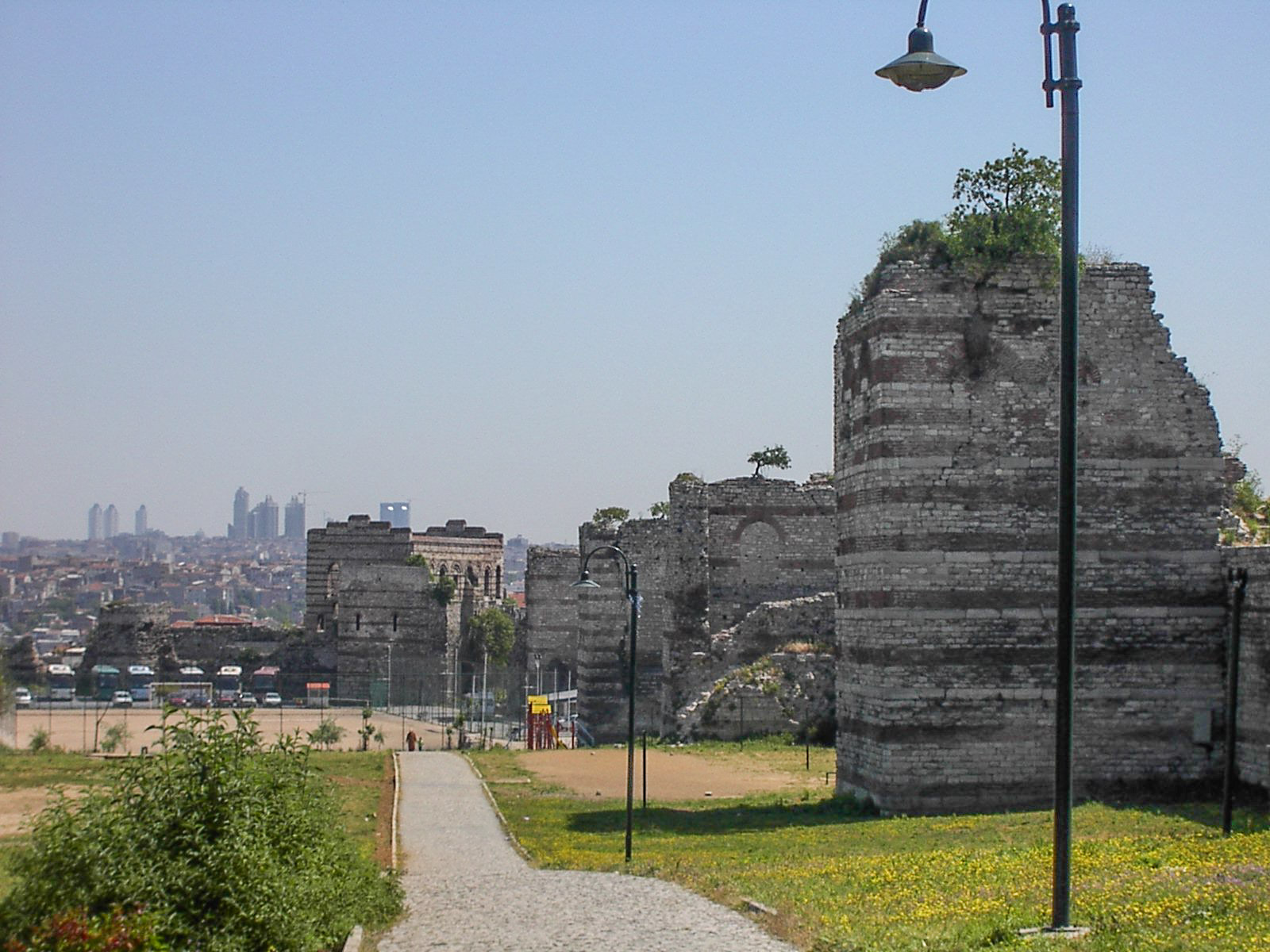
The palace, seen in the background (before the restoration), with the Theodosian Walls

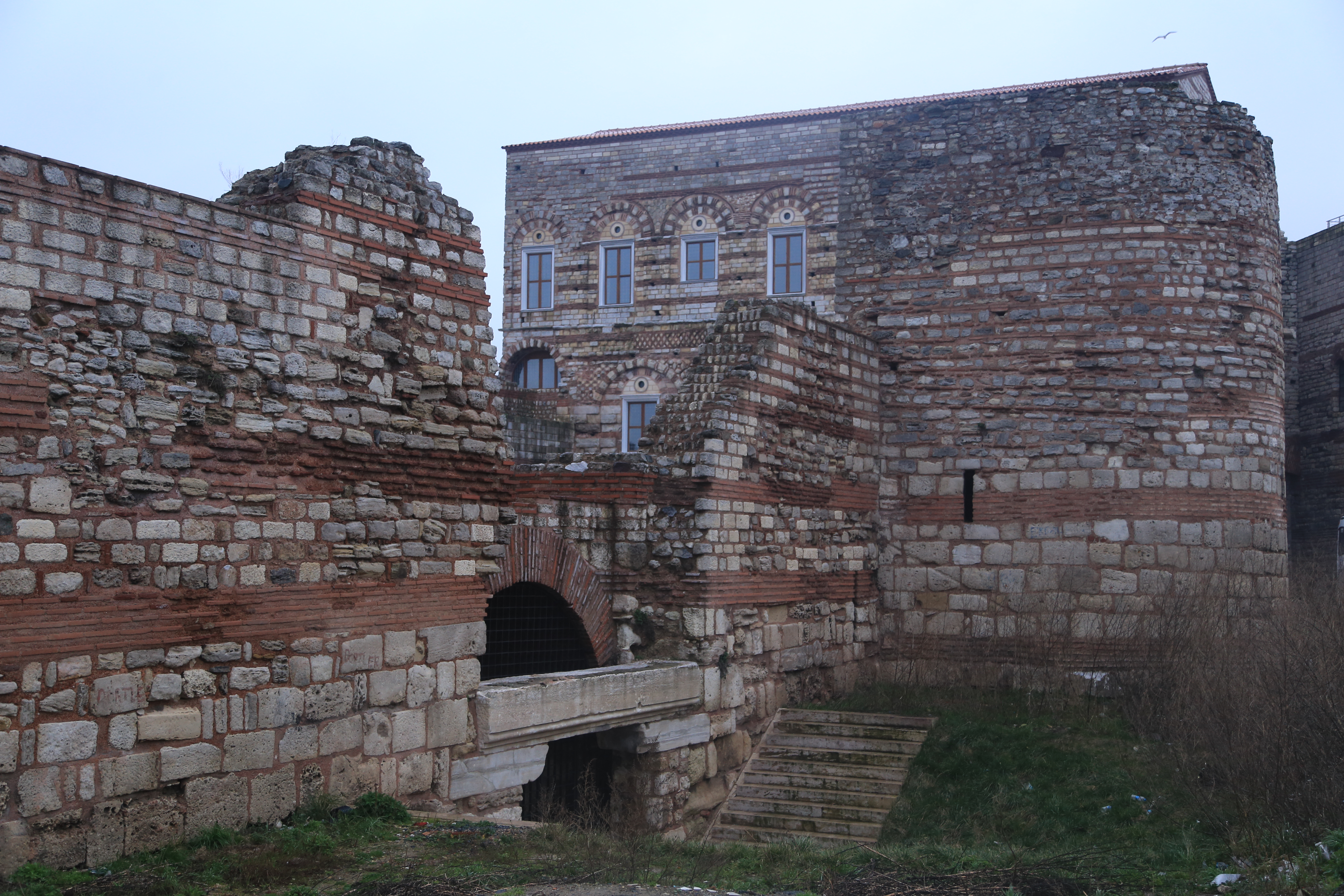
In 2015

== See also ==
- Palace of Blachernae
- Great Palace of Constantinople
- Boukoleon Palace
- Byzantine architecture

== Sources ==
- Freely, John (2000). Blue Guide Istanbul. W. W. Norton & Company. ISBN 0-393-32014-6.
- Cruikshank, Dan (1996). Sir Banister Fletcher's A History of Architecture. Architectural Press. ISBN 0-7506-2267-9.
- Baker, Bernard Granville (1910). The Walls of Constantinople. James Pott & Co. ISBN 154693619X.
- Blair, Shelia (1996). The Art and Architecture of Islam, 1250-1800. Yale University Press. ISBN 0-300-06465-9.
- Treadgold, Warren (1997). A History of the Byzantine State and Society. Stanford, California: Stanford University Press. ISBN 0-8047-2630-2.
- Van Millingen, Alexander (1899). Byzantine Constantinople: The Walls of the City and Adjoining Historical Sites. London: John Murray Ed.
