= Palace of Blachernae =

Former palace in Constantinople

Coordinates: 41.0339°N 28.9403°E

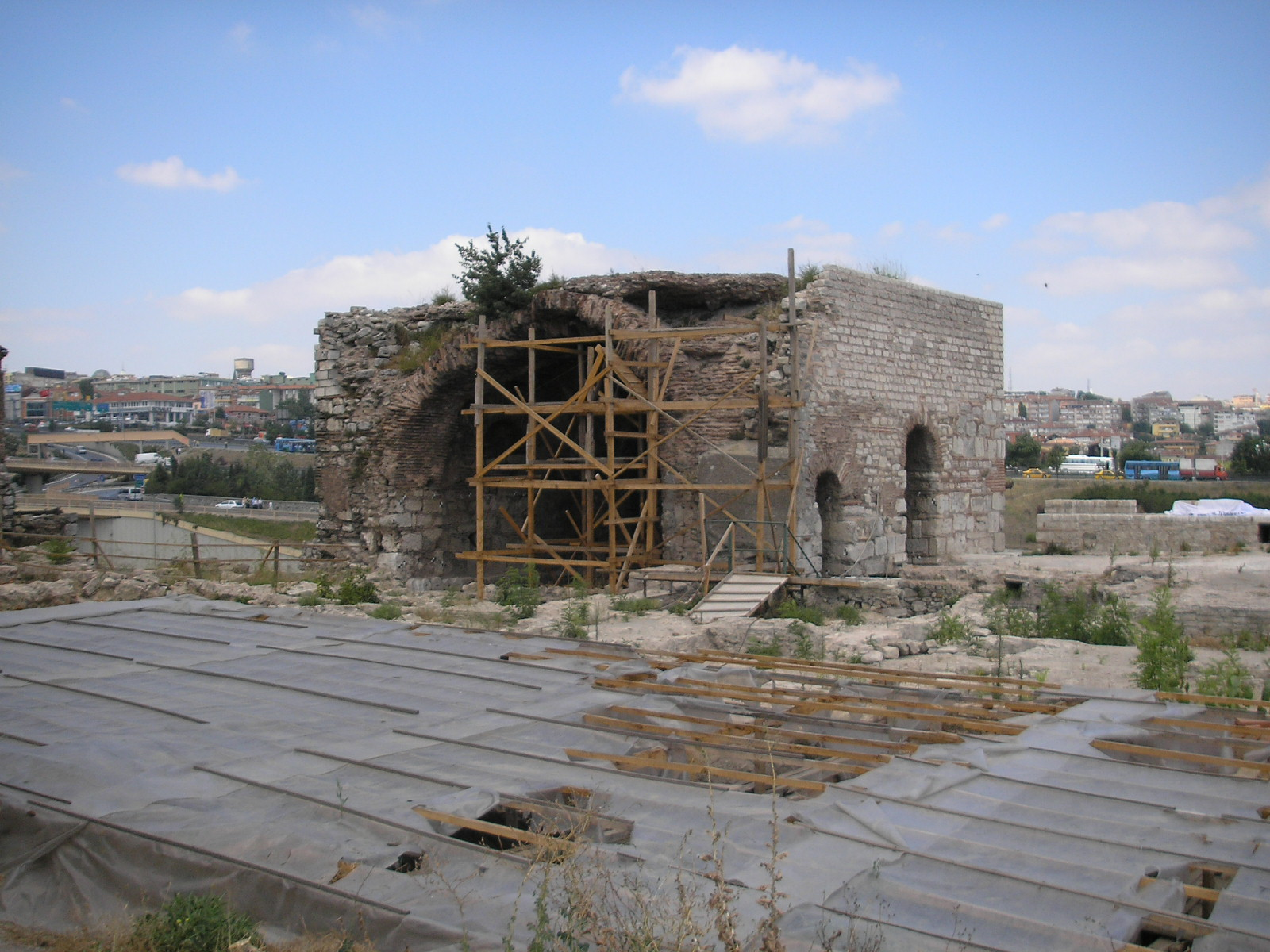
View from inside the city walls of a part of the Eastern Roman Imperial Palace of Blachernae, in Istanbul.

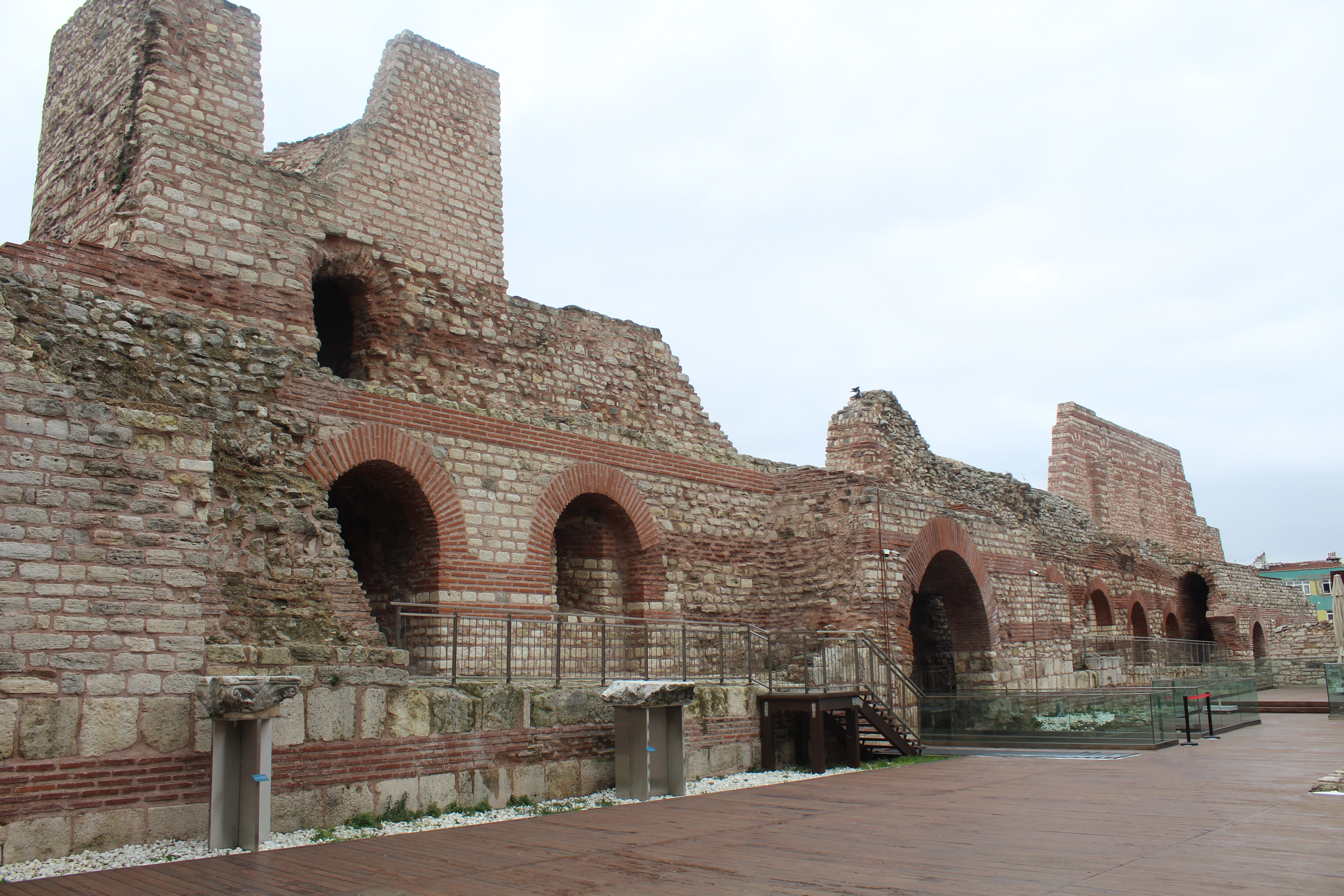

The Palace of Blachernae (Greek: τὸ ἐν Βλαχέρναις Παλάτιον) was an imperial Byzantine residence in the suburb of Blachernae, located in the northwestern section of Constantinople (today located in the quarter of Ayvansaray in Fatih, Istanbul, Turkey). The area of the palace is now mostly overbuilt, and only literary sources are available as to its description.

== History ==
The Palace of Blachernae was constructed on the northern slopes of the Sixth Hill of the city in circa 500. The hill itself was partially remodelled, particularly in later times, and a number of terraces created to support the various buildings comprising the palace complex.

Although the main imperial residence during the 4th–11th centuries was the Great Palace at the eastern end of the city, the Blachernae palace was used at times, and is attested in the ceremonial protocols contained in the 10th-century De Ceremoniis, or Explanation of the Order of the Palace, Chapters I.27, I.34, II.9, II.12) of Emperor Constantine VII Porphyrogenitos (r. 913–959). At that time, it included several structures: the hall (triklinos) of Anastasius or Anastasiakos (Τρίκλινος Ἀναστασιακός), named after Emperor Anastasius I (r. 491–518) who built it, the hall of the Ocean or Okeanos (Τρίκλινος Ὠκεανός), the portico of Joseph or Iosephiakos (Πόρτικας Ἰωσηφιακός), and the hall of the Danube or Danoubios (Τρίκλινος Δανουβιός). The latter communicated with the nearby shrine of the Greek Orthodox Church of St. Mary of Blachernae through a series of staircases.

It was here that in the late 11th century the Emperor Alexios I Komnenos (r. 1081–1118) moved his main residence, and he and his grandson Manuel I Komnenos (r. 1143–1180) undertook great works there, fortifying the palace precinct and erecting new halls. Manuel I, in particular, is credited with the construction of an elaborate outer wall, and of several splendid new halls, such as the Hall of Irene (named after Empress Irene of Hungary) and the Polytimos Oikos ("Precious Hall").

During the Second Crusade, this was the residence at which Emperor Manuel welcomed Louis VII of France and his Queen, Eleanor of Aquitaine. At this time the palace complex became known as the "New Palace". Among the structures of the time, only the so-called Prison of Anemas, which formed part of the palace's substructure, still survives.

After the Fourth Crusade, the Latin emperors favoured the Bucoleon Palace, but on the recapture of the city in 1261, the Palaiologan emperors restored the Blachernae complex as their principal residence.

The Palace of Blachernae was destroyed following the fall of Constantinople in 1453. During three days of pillaging, the Ottoman official Tursun Beg noted the fate of the Palace in passing when he described that the Palace was pillaged along with other houses of the rich, during which the inhabitants of the city was captured for slavery in the Ottoman Empire:

"After having completely overcome the enemy, the soldiers began to plunder the city. They enslaved boys and girls and took silver and gold vessels, precious stones and all sorts of valuable goods and fabrics from the imperial palace and the houses of the rich... Every tent was filled with handsome boys and beautiful girls...".

The Palace of the Porphyrogenitus, probably dating to the late 13th century, although a little further south than the main Blachernae palace complex, is usually related to it. It is the only relatively intact example of Byzantine palace architecture in Constantinople.

== See also ==
- Palace of the Porphyrogenitus
- Great Palace of Constantinople
- Boukoleon Palace

== Sources ==
- Kazhdan, Alexander, ed. (1991). The Oxford Dictionary of Byzantium. Oxford and New York: Oxford University Press. ISBN 0-19-504652-8.
- van Millingen, Alexander (1899). Byzantine Constantinople: The Walls of the City and Adjoining Historical Sites. London, United Kingdom: John Murray.
