= Boukoleon Palace =

c. 5th-century Byzantine palace in Constantinople (now Istanbul, Turkey)

- Βουκολέων
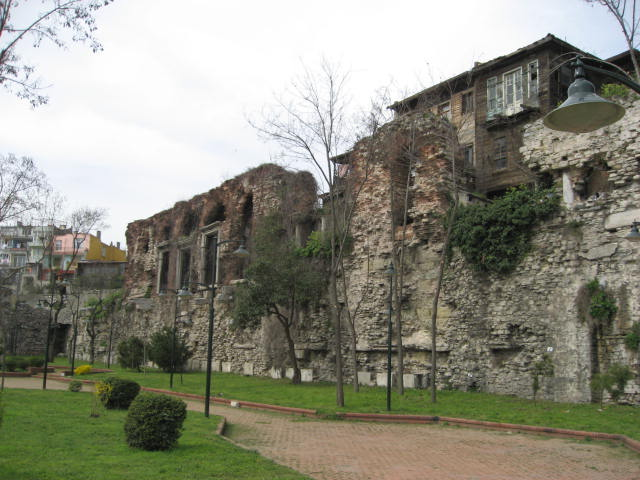
- A view of Boukoleon Palace

- Location within Istanbul Fatih

General information
- Status: Restoration
- Type: Palace
- Architectural style: Byzantine architecture
- Location: Istanbul, Turkey
- Coordinates: 41°0′9″N 28°58′32″E
- Construction started: 5th century
- Client: Byzantine emperors
- Owner: Istanbul Metropolitan Municipality

Website
- https://www.ktb.gov.tr/

The Palace of Boukoleon (Greek: Βουκολέων) or Bucoleon was one of the Byzantine palaces in Constantinople (present-day Istanbul in Turkey). The palace is located on the shore of the Sea of Marmara, to the south of the Hippodrome and east of the Little Hagia Sophia.

== Names ==
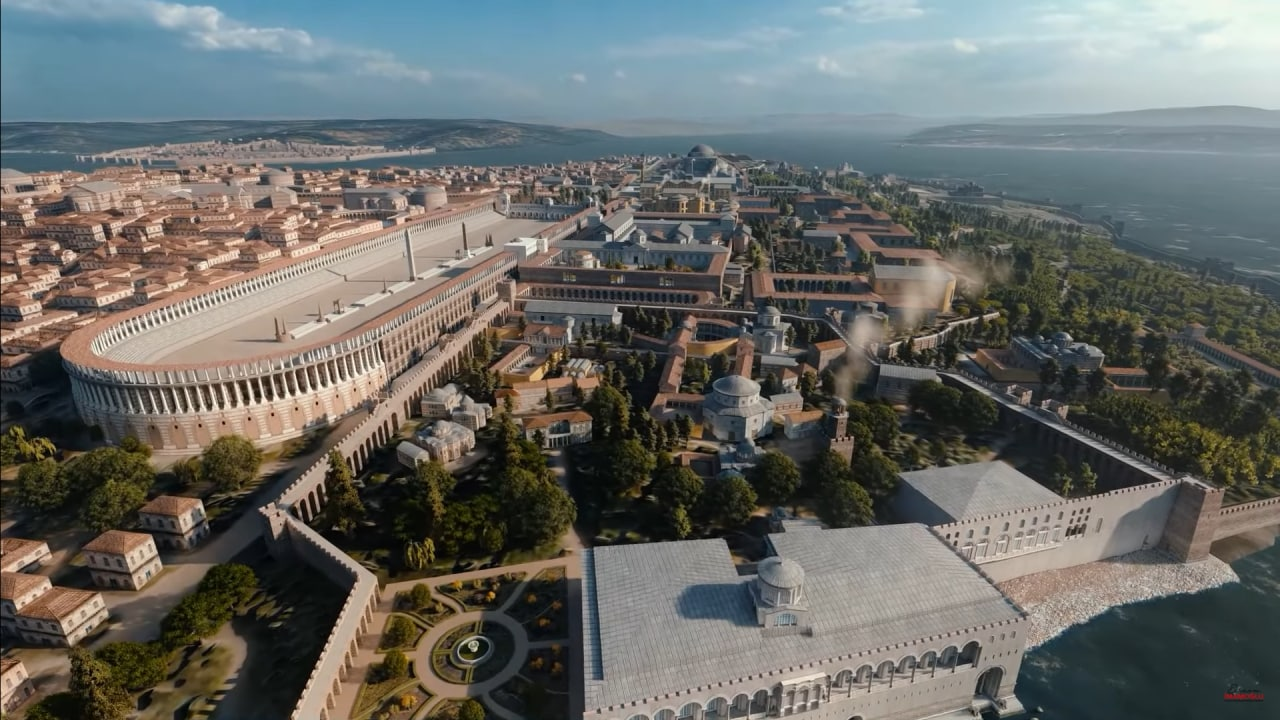
Virtual image of Byzantine era Constantinople. In the foreground of the image to the right, the Boukoleon Palace

The area was initially called Hormisdas after the Sasanian Persian prince Hormizd. The name Bucoleon was probably attributed after the end of the 6th century under Justinian I, when the small harbour in front of the palace, which is now filled, was constructed. According to tradition, a statue featuring a bull and a lion stood there, giving the port its name (βοῦς and λέων are Greek for "bull" and "lion" respectively). The palace is accordingly also called the "House of Hormisdas" and "House of Justinian".

== History ==
Boukoleon palace was probably built during the reign of Theodosius II in the 5th century. Emperor Theophilos rebuilt and expanded the palace, adding a large façade on top of the seaward walls and in 969 Emperor Nikephoros II built a circuit wall. Boukoleon would remain the main palace for the Byzantine court until the 11th century with the construction of the Palace of Blachernae by the Komnenos dynasty.

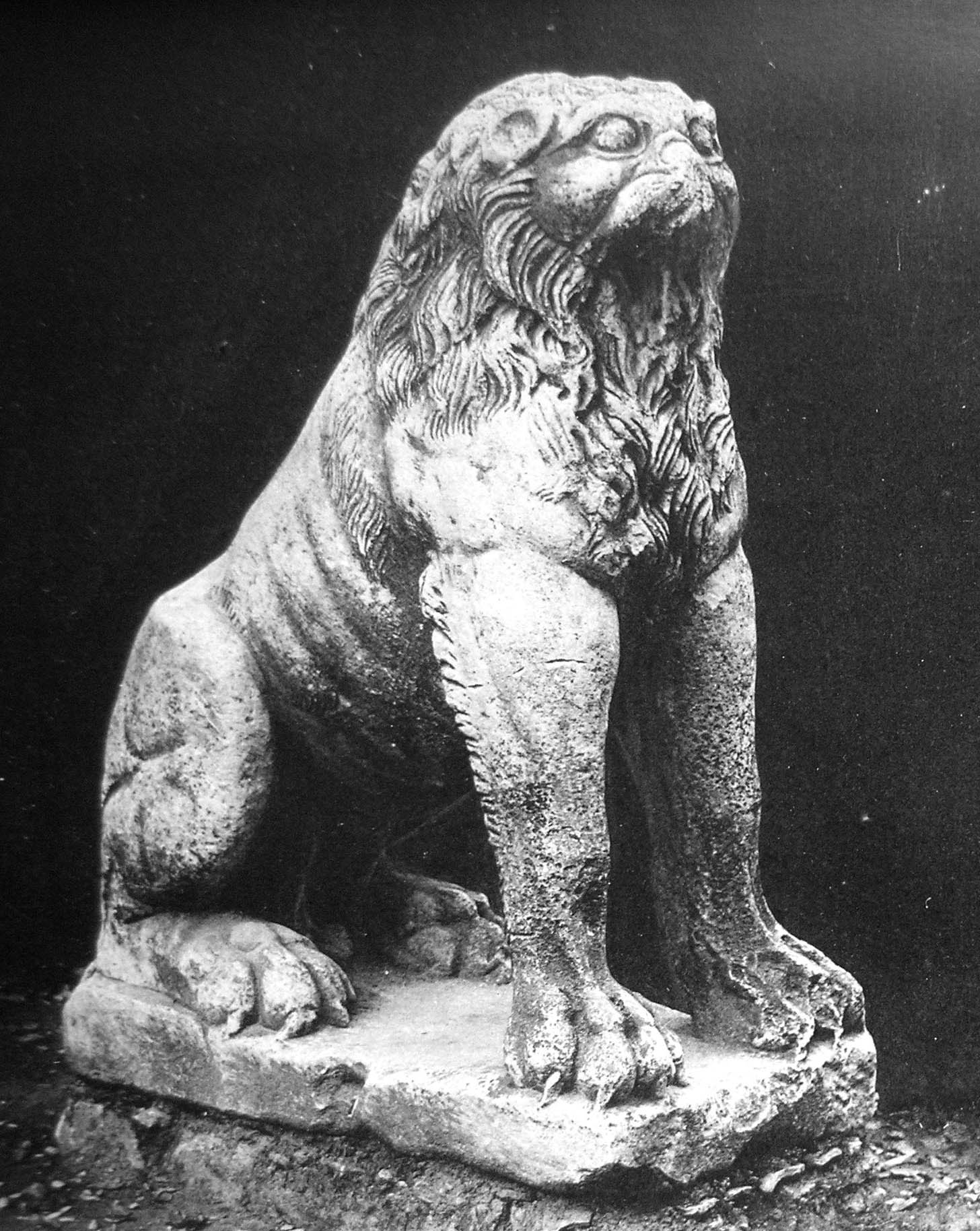
One of the stone lions at the entrance to the Bucoleon harbour, today at the Istanbul Archaeological Museums.

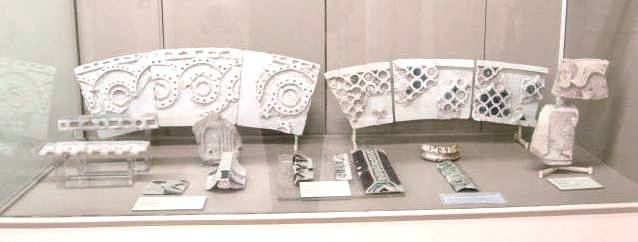
Fragments from the palace at the Istanbul Archaeological Museums.

Boukoleon was still used for state meetings; 1161 with the sultan of Rum, Kilij Arslan II, and 1171 with the King of Jerusalem, Amalric, and served as a religious meeting place, when Emperor Manuel I Komnenos held a church council in 1166.

Boukoleon housed the regalia of the Byzantine emperors, and the palace chapel included sacred relics. Access to the palace chapel was restricted, but despite this there are indications it was part of Christian pilgrimages.

== Fourth crusade ==
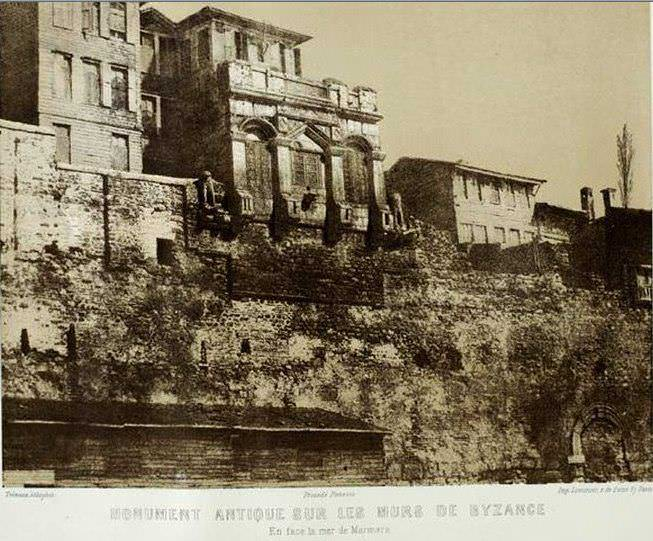
Palace structure from the year 1850

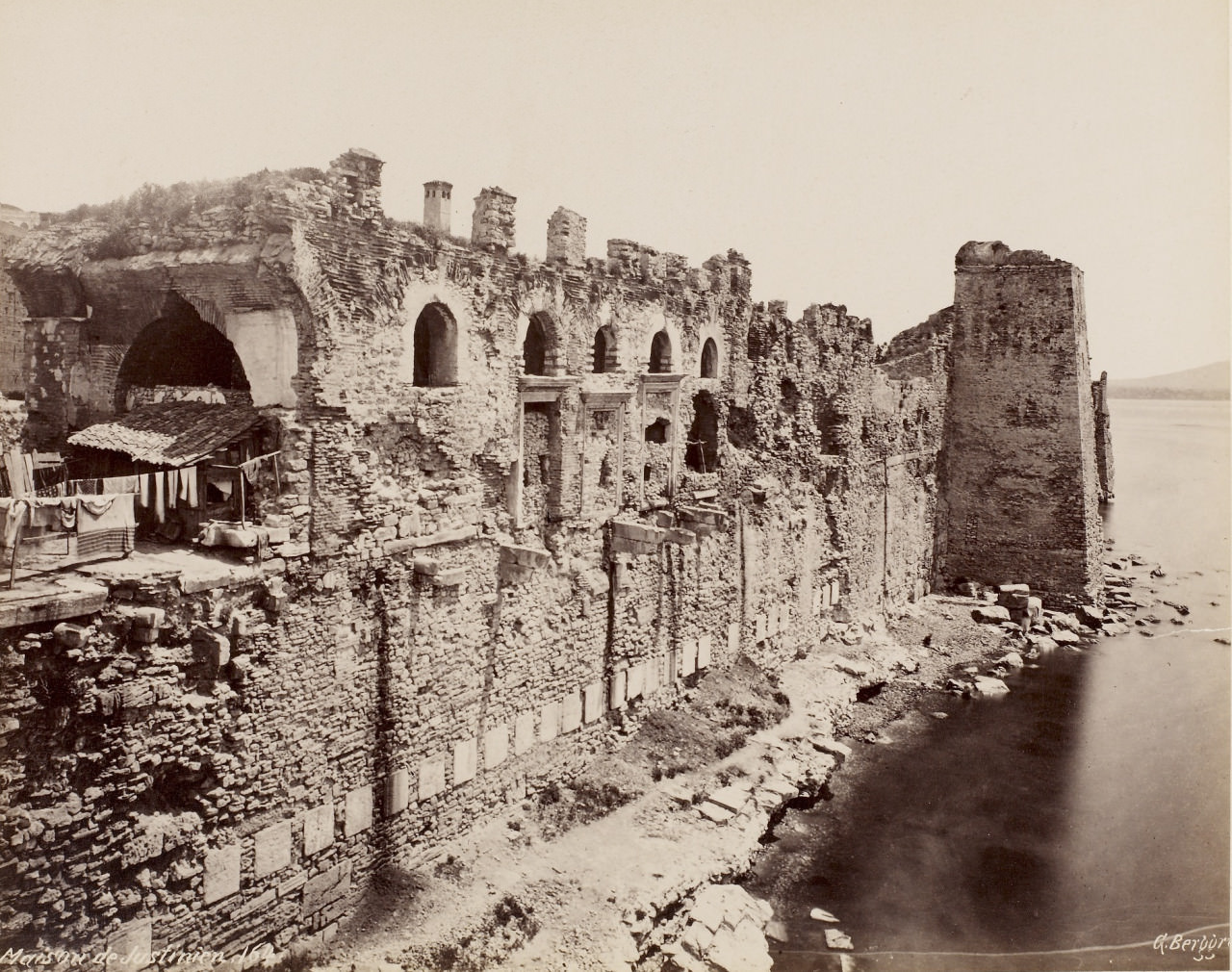
Palace structure from the year 1850

In the 1204 sacking of Constantinople during the Fourth Crusade, Boukoleon was taken by Boniface of Montferrat who:

"rode all along the shore to the palace of Bucoleon, and when he arrived there it surrendered, on condition that the lives of all therein should be spared. At Bucoleon were found the larger number of the great ladies who had fled to the castle, for there were found the sister of the King of France, who had been empress, and the sister of the King of Hungary, who had also been empress, and other ladies very many. Of the treasure that was found in that palace I cannot well speak, for there was so much that it was beyond end or counting." (Villehardouin)

Among the prizes, then, was Empress Margaret, daughter of Bela III of Hungary, whom Boniface married. During the subsequent Latin Empire (1204–1261), the Bucoleon continued to be used as an imperial residence. After the recapture of the city by Michael VIII Palaiologos, however, the palace, along with the entire Great Palace complex, was gradually abandoned in favour of the Blachernae Palace.

When Mehmet II, the Ottoman Sultan, entered the city in 1453, it was noted that the then-famous palace still stood, albeit in ruins. Upon his entrance to the palace, he allegedly uttered:

The spider weaves the curtains
in the palace of the Caesars
The owl calls the watches
in the towers of Afrasiab.

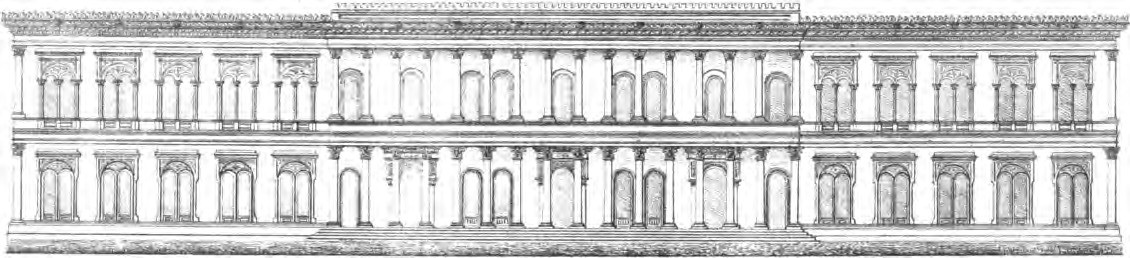
Byzantine topographic studies (1877)

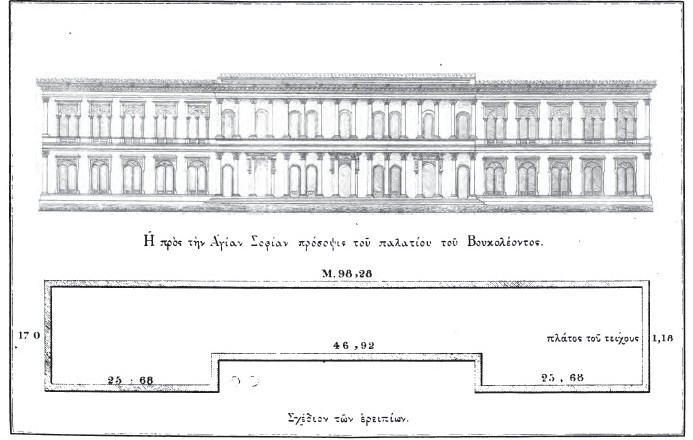
Byzantine topographic studies (1877)

== Modern day ==
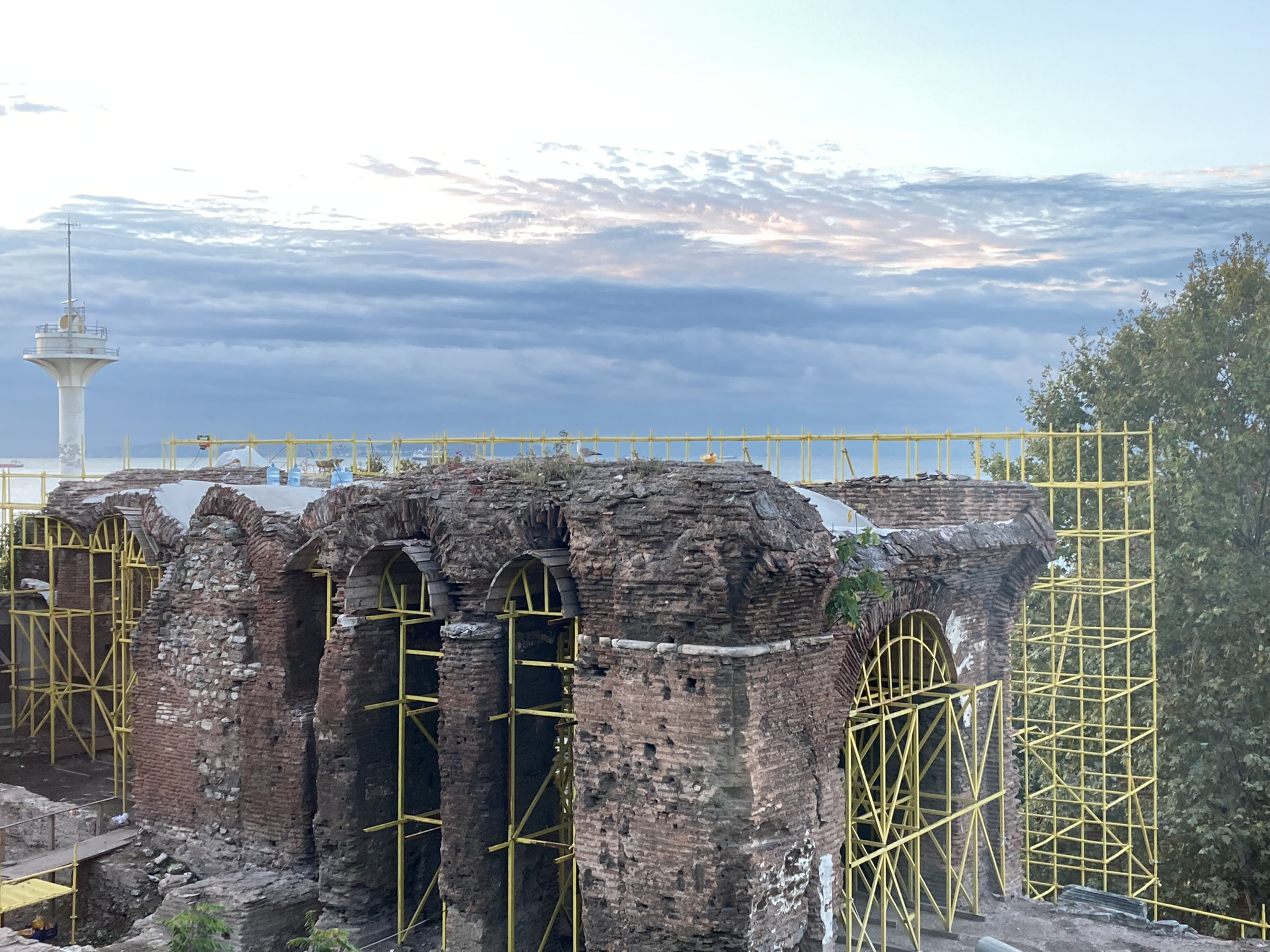
A photograph taken during the restoration process, October 2022

The ruins of the palace were partially destroyed in 1873 to make way for the railway line to Sirkeci. The ruins suggest that a balcony looking out to the sea was present, accessible through three marble-framed doorways, still visible today.

In 2018, it was announced by the Istanbul Metropolitan Municipality that the palace would be restored by the Cultural and Natural Heritage Conservation Board. It is planned that the palace will become an open-air museum with "a timber walking trail for visitors, a museum, and a pool."

In 2021, archaeologists discovered a Byzantine-era fountain while restoring the palace.

== Gallery ==
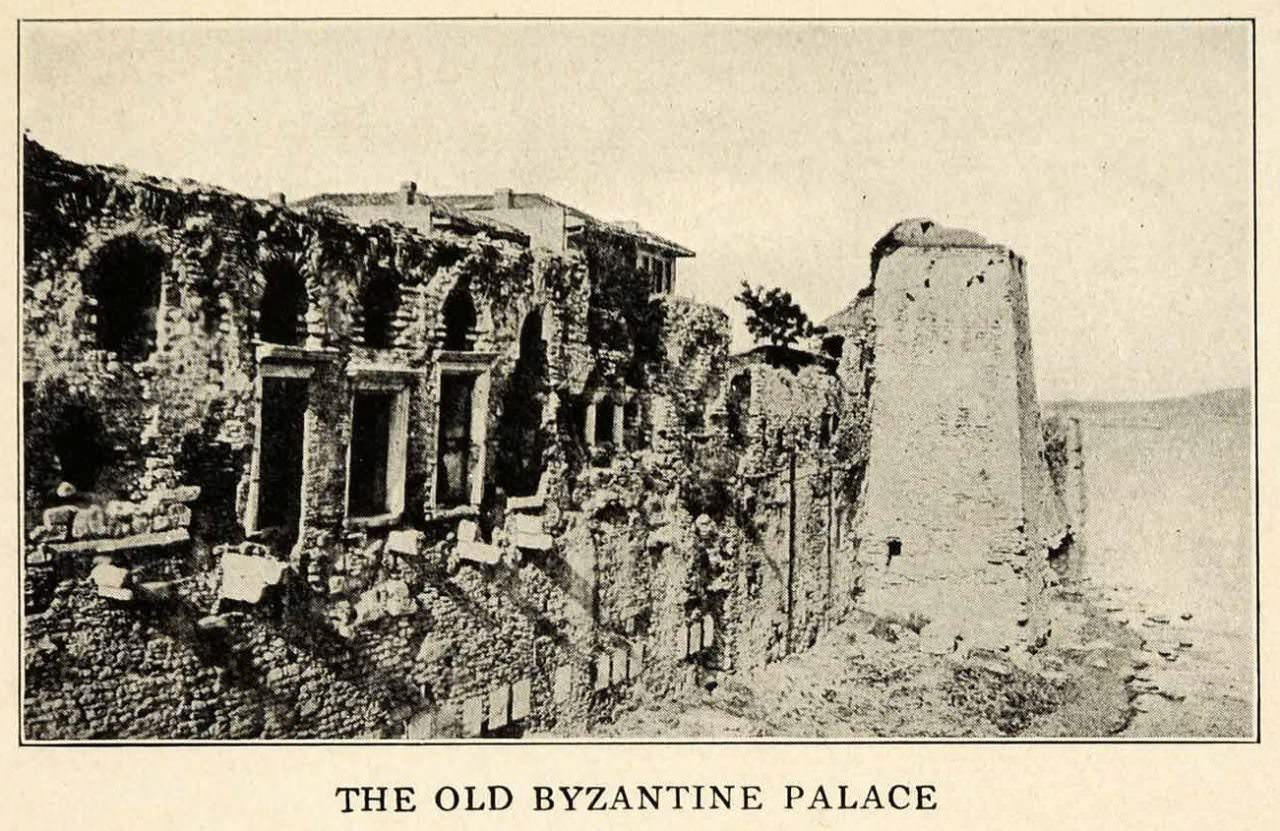
Palace of Boukoleon, 1923.

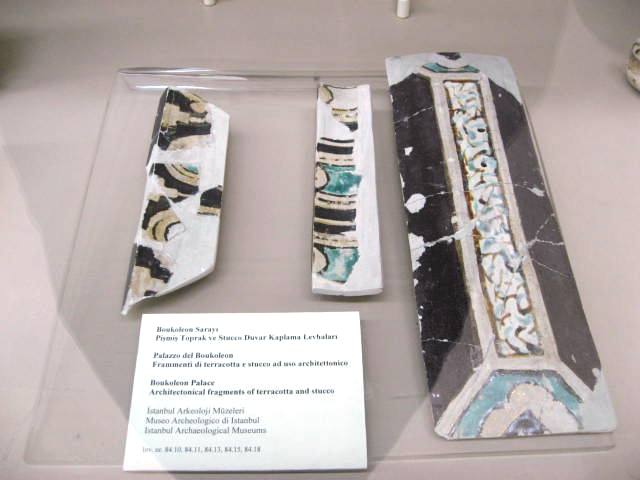
Boukoleon Palace. Architectonical fragments of terracotta and stucco.

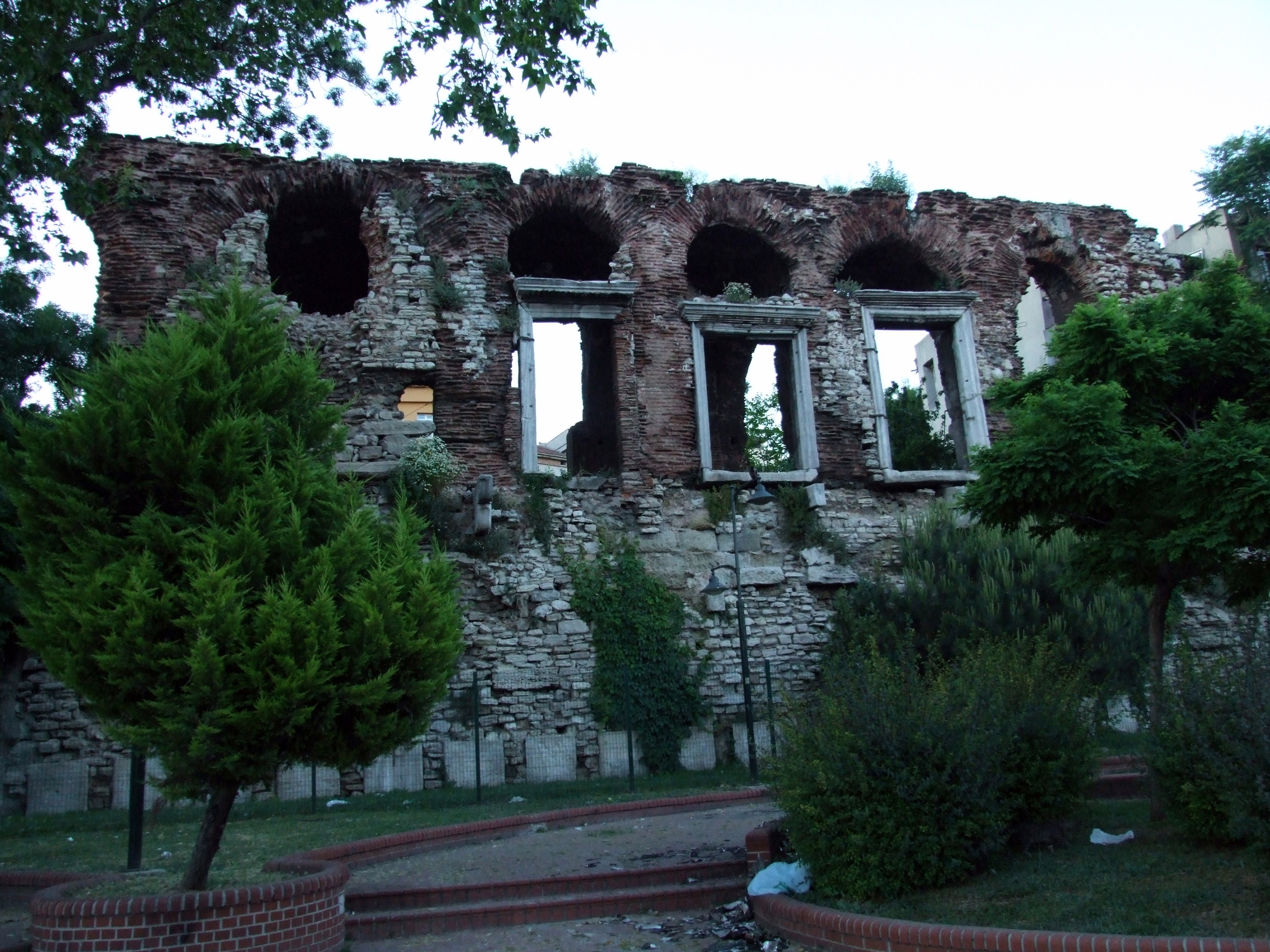
Bukoleon Palace, built in the 5th century.

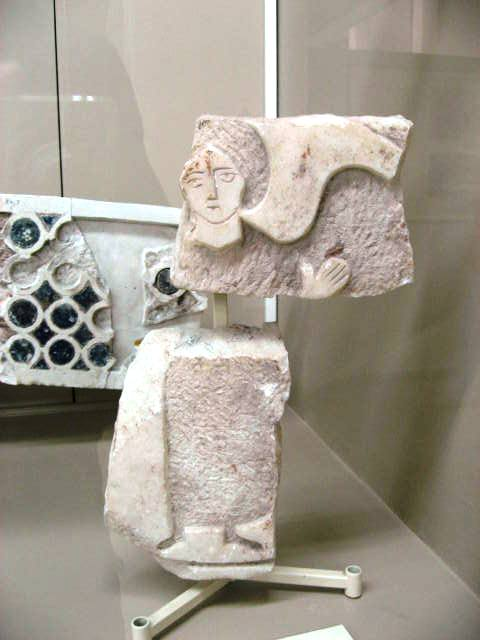
Boukoleon Palace Marble fragment of an icon with angel.

== See also ==
- Great Palace of Constantinople
- Palace of Blachernae
- Palace of the Porphyrogenitus
  - Porphyrogenitos

== Sources ==
- Bardill, Jonathan (2004). Brickstamps of Constantinople. Oxford University Press.
- Magdalino, Paul (2011). "Court and Capital in Byzantium". In Duindam, Jeroen; Artan, Tülay; Kunt, Metin (eds.). Royal Courts in Dynastic States and Empires: A Global Perspective. Vol. 1. Brill.
- McCormick, Michael (2000). "Emperor and Court". In Cameron, Averil; Ward-Perkins, Bryan; Whitby, Michael (eds.). The Cambridge Ancient History: Late Antiquity: Empire and Successors, A.D. 425–600. Vol. XIV. Cambridge University Press.
