= Great Palace of Constantinople =

Byzantine imperial palace complex

Coordinates: 41°0′21″N 28°58′38″E

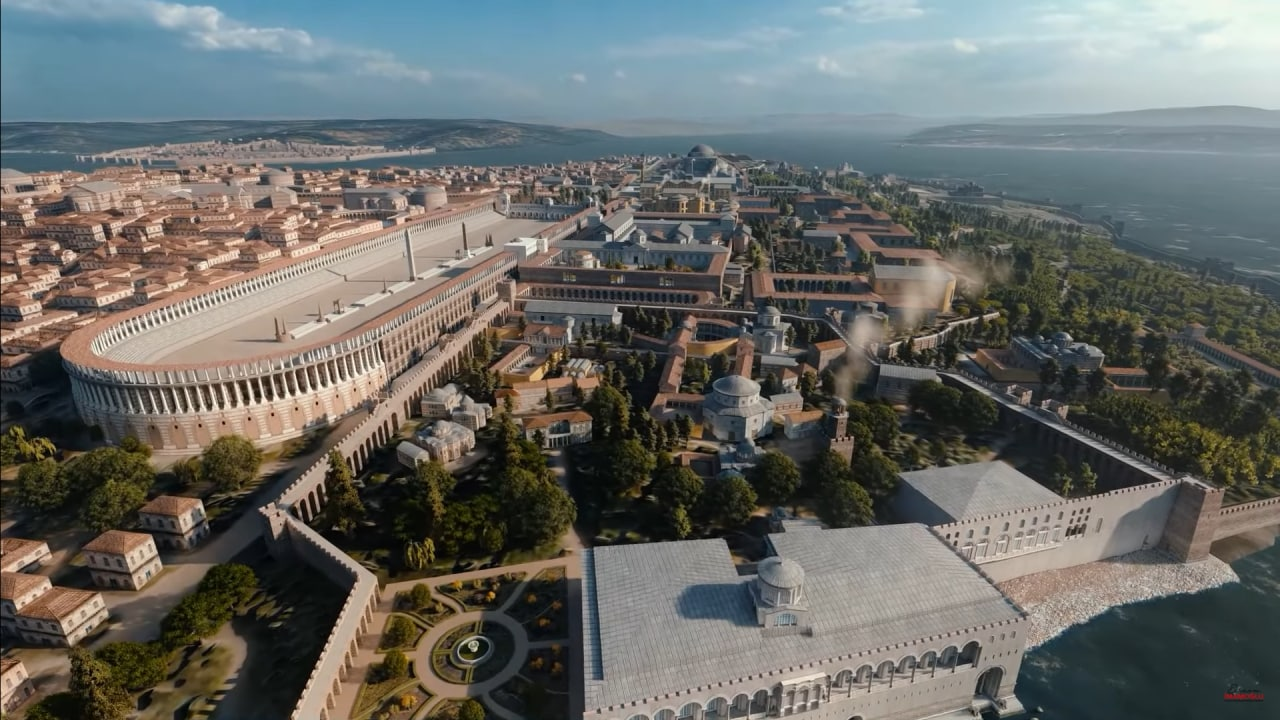
A virtual image of Constantinople in the Byzantine era, looking from south to north. The Boukoleon Palace is in the foreground. Behind it, the Church of Saints Sergius and Bacchus, the Great Palace, the Magnaura (Senate) and (further behind) the Hagia Sophia are visible. The Hippodrome is prominently visible at left.

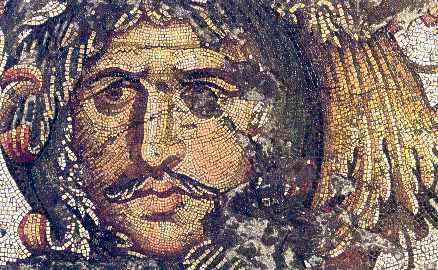
A scene from the scroll border of the Great Palace Mosaic, a mosaic floor of scenes from daily life and mythology in a hall of yet unidentified uses and controversial date.

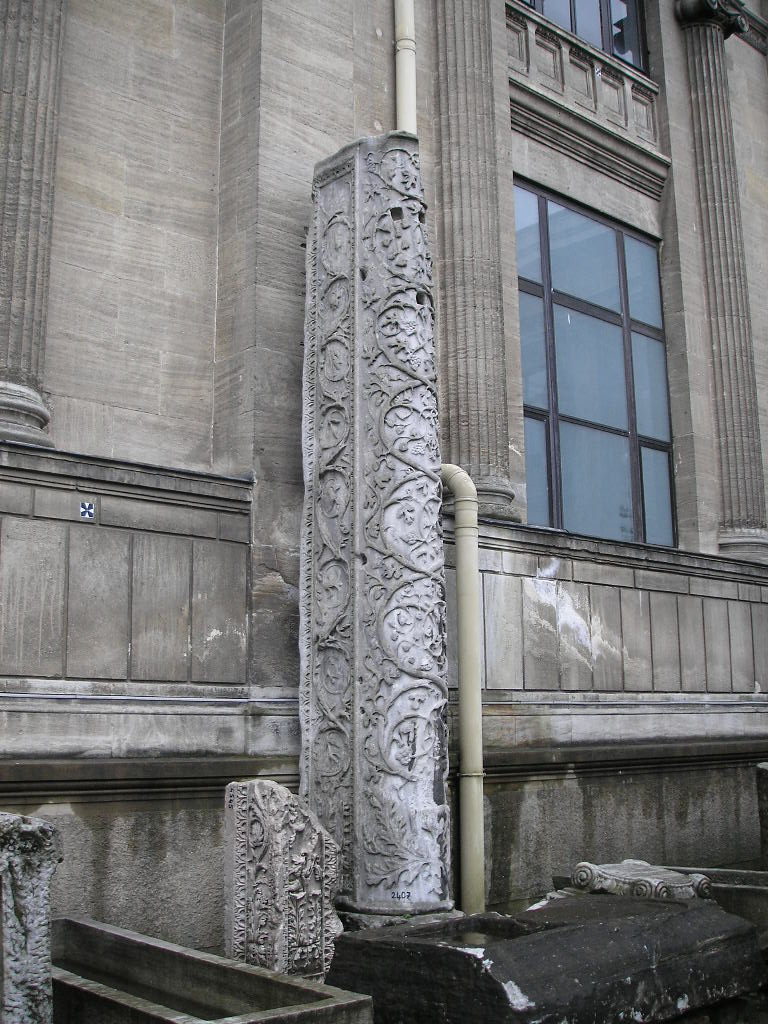
One of the piers from the Great Palace, now in the courtyard of the Istanbul Archaeological Museums

The Great Palace of Constantinople (Greek: Μέγα Παλάτιον, Méga Palátion; Latin: Palatium Magnum), also known as the Sacred Palace (Greek: Ἱερὸν Παλάτιον, Hieròn Palátion; Latin: Sacrum Palatium), was the large imperial Byzantine palace complex located in the south-eastern end of the peninsula today making up the Fatih district of Istanbul (formerly Constantinople), in modern Turkey. It served as the main imperial residence of the Eastern Roman emperors until 1081 and was the centre of imperial administration for over 690 years. Only a few remnants and fragments of its foundations have survived into the present day.

== History ==
When Constantine the Great refounded Byzantium as Constantinople in 330, he planned out a palace for himself. The palace was located between the Hippodrome and Hagia Sophia.

The complex of palaces was rebuilt and expanded several times during its history. Much of the complex was destroyed during the Nika riots of 532 and was rebuilt lavishly by the emperor Justinian I. Further extensions and alterations were commissioned by Justinian II and Basil I. However, it had fallen into disrepair by the time of Constantine VII, who ordered its renovation. From the early 11th century onwards emperors favoured the Palace of Blachernae as an imperial residence, though they continued to use the Great Palace as the primary administrative and ceremonial centre of the city. It declined substantially during the following century when parts of the complex were demolished or filled with rubble. During the sack of Constantinople by the Fourth Crusade, the palace was plundered by the soldiers of Boniface of Montferrat. Although the subsequent Latin emperors continued to use the palace complex, they lacked money for its maintenance. The last Latin emperor, Baldwin II, went as far as removing the lead roofs of the palace and selling them.

One of the biggest halls of the Great Palace known as the "Trullo hall" hosted Third Council of Constantinople, recognized as the ecumenical council by both Roman Catholic and Eastern Orthodox churches and Quinisext Council or "Council in Trullo".

Consequently, when the city was retaken by the forces of Michael VIII Palaiologos in 1261, the Great Palace was in disrepair. The Palaiologos emperors largely abandoned it, ruling from Blachernae and using the vaults as a prison. When Mehmed II entered the city in 1453, he found the palace ruined and abandoned. As he wandered its empty halls and pavilions, he allegedly whispered a quote from the Persian poet Saadi:

The spider is curtain-bearer in the palace of Chosroes,
The owl sounds the relief in the castle of Afrasiyab.

Much of the palace was demolished in the general rebuilding of Constantinople in the early years of the Ottoman era. The area was initially turned into housing with a number of small mosques before Sultan Ahmet I demolished the remnants of the Daphne and Kathisma Palaces to build the Sultan Ahmed Mosque and its adjoining buildings. The site of the Great Palace began to be investigated in the late 19th century and an early 20th-century fire uncovered a section of the Great Palace. On this site prison cells, many large rooms, and possibly tombs were found.

=== Excavations ===
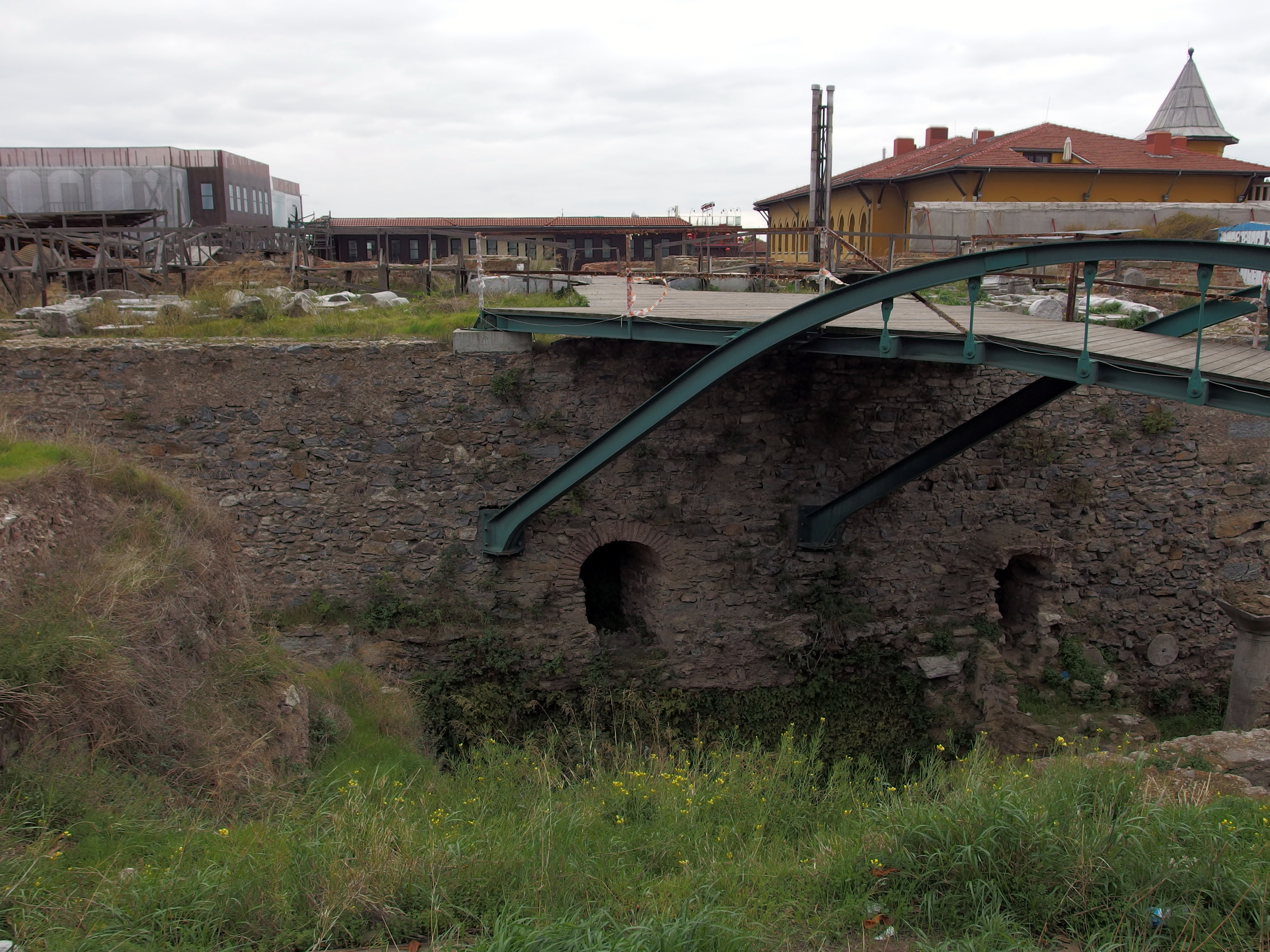
Remains of the Great Palace of Constantinople

Initial excavations were carried out by French archaeologists at the Palace of Manganae between 1921 and 1923. A much larger excavation was carried out by the University of St Andrews in 1935 to 1938. Further excavations took place under the directorship of David Talbot Rice from 1952 to 1954, which uncovered a section of one of the south-western buildings at the Arasta Bazaar. The archaeologists discovered a spectacular series of wall and floor mosaics which have been conserved in the Great Palace Mosaic Museum.

Excavations are continuing elsewhere, but so far, less than one quarter of the total area covered by the palace has been excavated; total excavation is not presently feasible as most of the palace currently lies underneath the Sultan Ahmed Mosque and other Ottoman-era buildings.

== Description ==
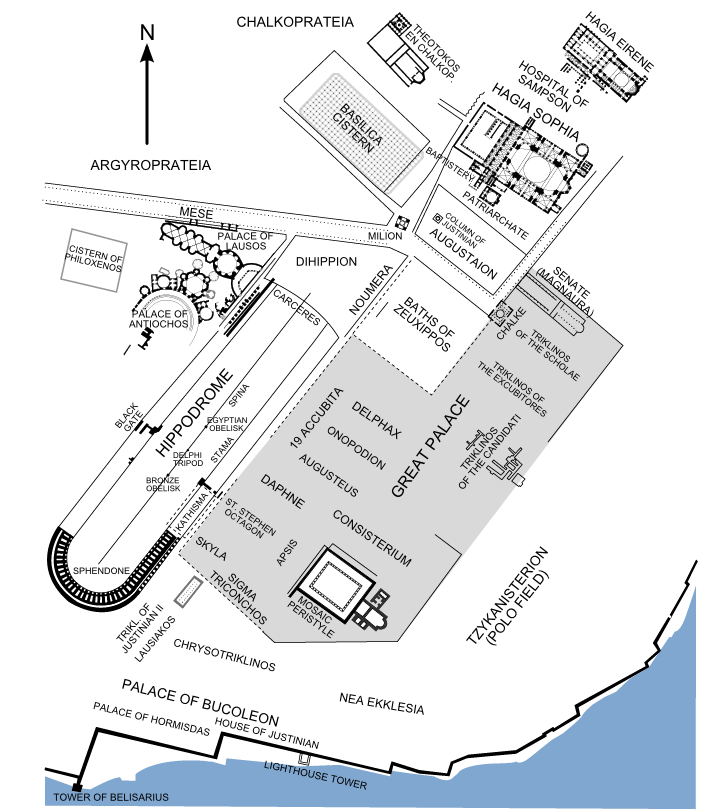
Map of the administrative heart of Constantinople. The structures of the Great Palace are shown in their approximate position as derived from literary sources. Surviving structures are in black.

The palace was located in the southeastern corner of the peninsula where Constantinople is situated, behind the Hippodrome and the Hagia Sophia. The palace is considered by scholars to have been a series of pavilions, much like the Ottoman-era Topkapı Palace that succeeded it. The total surface area of the Great Palace exceeded 200,000 square feet (19,000 m^{2}), and the total area of the complex encompassed 16 hectares (160,000 m^{2}). It stood on a steeply sloping hillside that descends nearly 33 metres (108 ft) from the Hippodrome to the shoreline, which necessitated the construction of large substructures and vaults. The palace complex occupied six distinct terraces descending to the shore.

The main entrance to the palace quarter was the Chalke (Bronze) gate at the Augustaion. The Augustaion was located on the south side of the Hagia Sophia, and it was there that the city's main street, the Mese ("Middle Street"), began. To the east of the square lay the Senate house or Palace of Magnaura, where the University was later housed, and to the west the Milion (the mile marker, from which all distances were measured), and the old Baths of Zeuxippus.

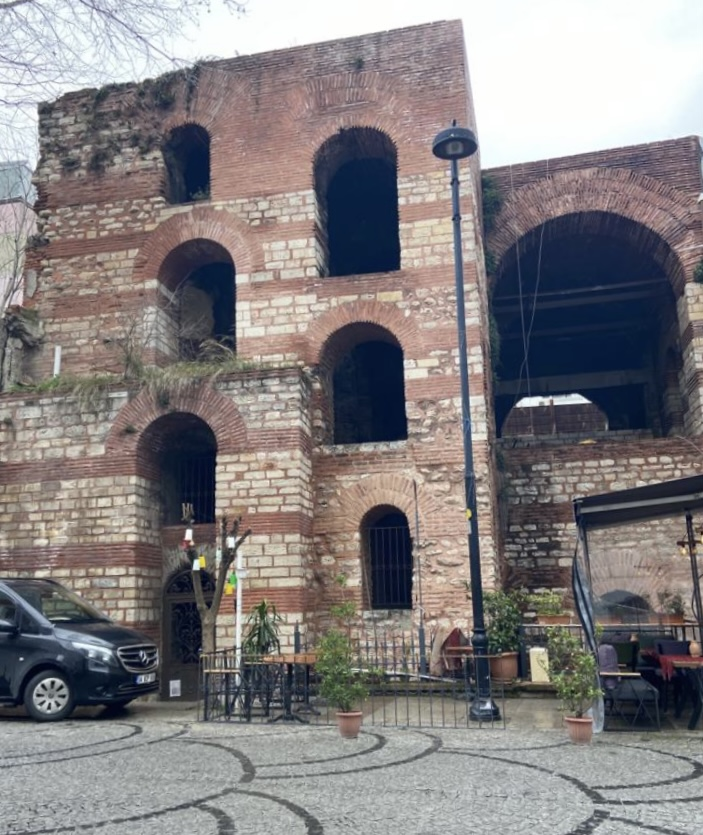
Surviving part of the Magnaura

Immediately behind the Chalke Gate, facing southwards, were the barracks of the palace guards, the Scholae Palatinae. After the barracks stood the reception hall of the 19 Accubita ("Nineteen Couches"), followed by the Palace of Daphne, in early Byzantine times the main imperial residence. It included the Octagon, the emperor's bedchamber. From the Daphne, a passage led directly to the imperial box (kathisma) in the Hippodrome. The main throne room was the Chrysotriklinos, built by Justin II, and expanded and renovated by Basil I, with the palatine chapel of the Theotokos of the Pharos nearby. To its north lay the Triconchos palace, built by the emperor Theophilos and accessible through a semicircular antechamber known as the Sigma. To the east of the Triconchos lay the lavishly decorated Nea Ekklesia ("New Church"), built by Basil I, with five gilded domes. The church survived until after the Ottoman conquest. It was used as a gunpowder magazine and exploded when it was struck by lightning in 1490. Between the church and the sea walls lay the polo field of the Tzykanisterion.

Further to the south, detached from the main complex lay the seaside palace of Bucoleon. It was built by Theophilos, incorporating parts of the sea walls, and used extensively until the 13th century, especially during the Latin Empire (1204–1261) whose Catholic emperors from Western Europe favoured the seaside palace. A seaward gate gave direct access to the imperial harbour of Bucoleon.

== See also ==
- Great Palace Mosaic Museum
- Magnaura
- Hippodrome of Constantinople
- Palace of Blachernae
- Palace of the Porphyrogenitus
- Old Darülfünun building
