= Great Palace Mosaic Museum =

Museum of Byzantine mosaics in Istanbul

Coordinates: 41°00′16″N 28°58′36″E

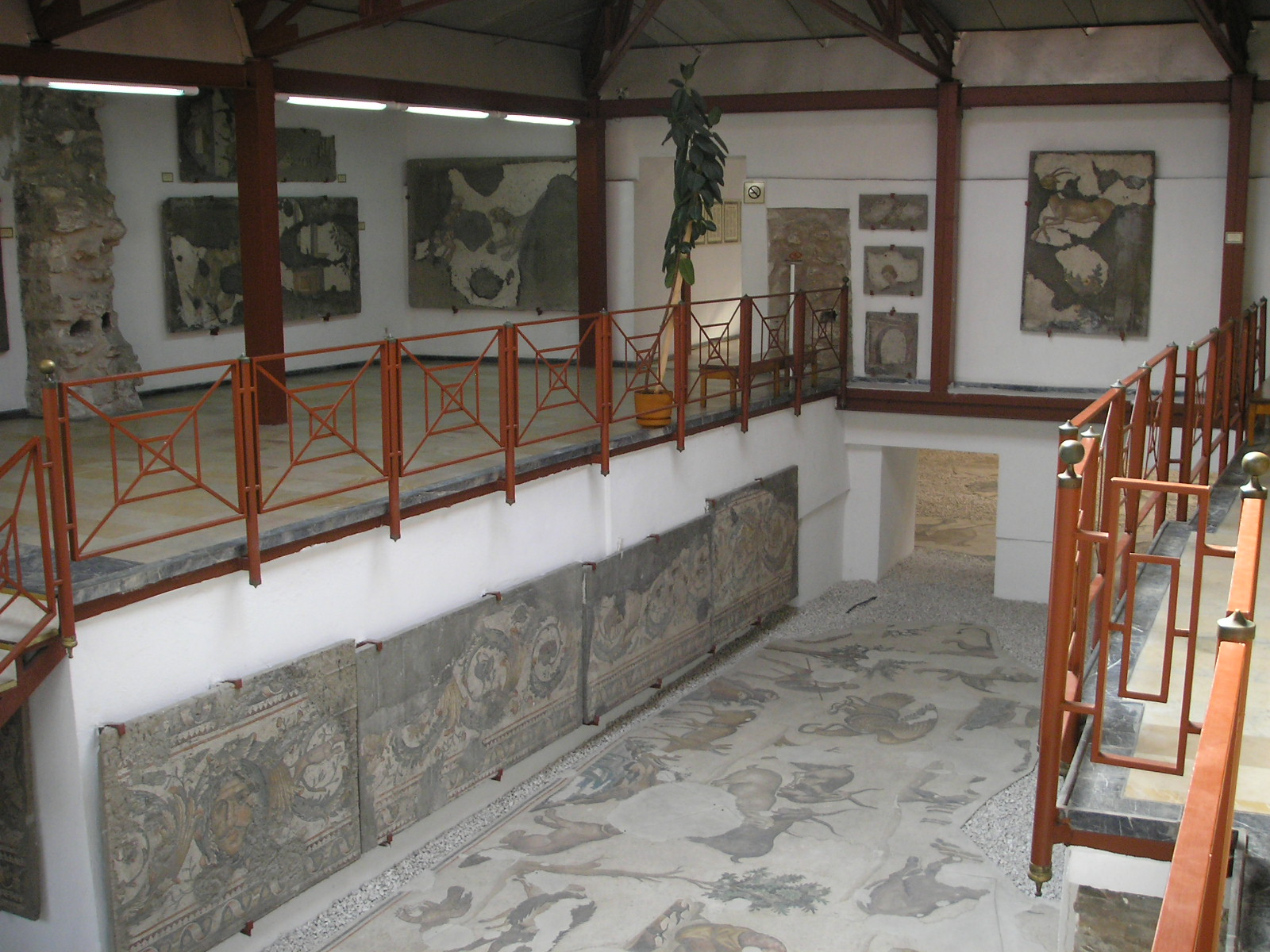
The Great Palace Mosaic Museum in Istanbul

The Great Palace Mosaic Museum (Turkish: Büyük Saray Mozaikleri Müzesi), is located close to Sultanahmet Square in Istanbul, Turkey, at Arasta Bazaar. The museum houses mosaics from the Byzantine period, unearthed at the site of the Great Palace of Constantinople.

== History ==
The museum hosts the mosaics used to decorate the pavement of a peristyle court, dating possibly to the reign of Byzantine emperor Justinian I (r. 527–565), although more recent analysis suggests a later date during the reign of Heraclius. It was uncovered by British archaeologists from the University of St Andrews in Scotland during extensive excavations at the Arasta Bazaar in Sultan Ahmet Square in 1935–1938 and 1951–1954. The area formed part of the south-western area of the Great Palace, and the excavations discovered a large peristyle courtyard, with a surface of 1,872 m^{2} (20,150 sq ft), entirely decorated with mosaics. It was at this point that the Austrian Academy of Sciences, supervised by Prof. Dr. Werner Jobst, undertook to study and preserve the famous palace mosaic and to carry out additional archeological examinations (1983–1997) within the scope of a cooperative project with the Directorate General of Monuments and Museums in Turkey.

The subject matter of the mosaics range from a Dionysian procession (the elephant and woman with a jug to many combat scenes featuring both human and non-human animal fighters. Intermixed are also various animals, including lions, eagles, snakes, and even multiple versions of the griffin.

The museum was closed for restoration activities in July 2023. As of May 2024, the museum remains closed and a re-opening date has not been announced.

== Gallery ==
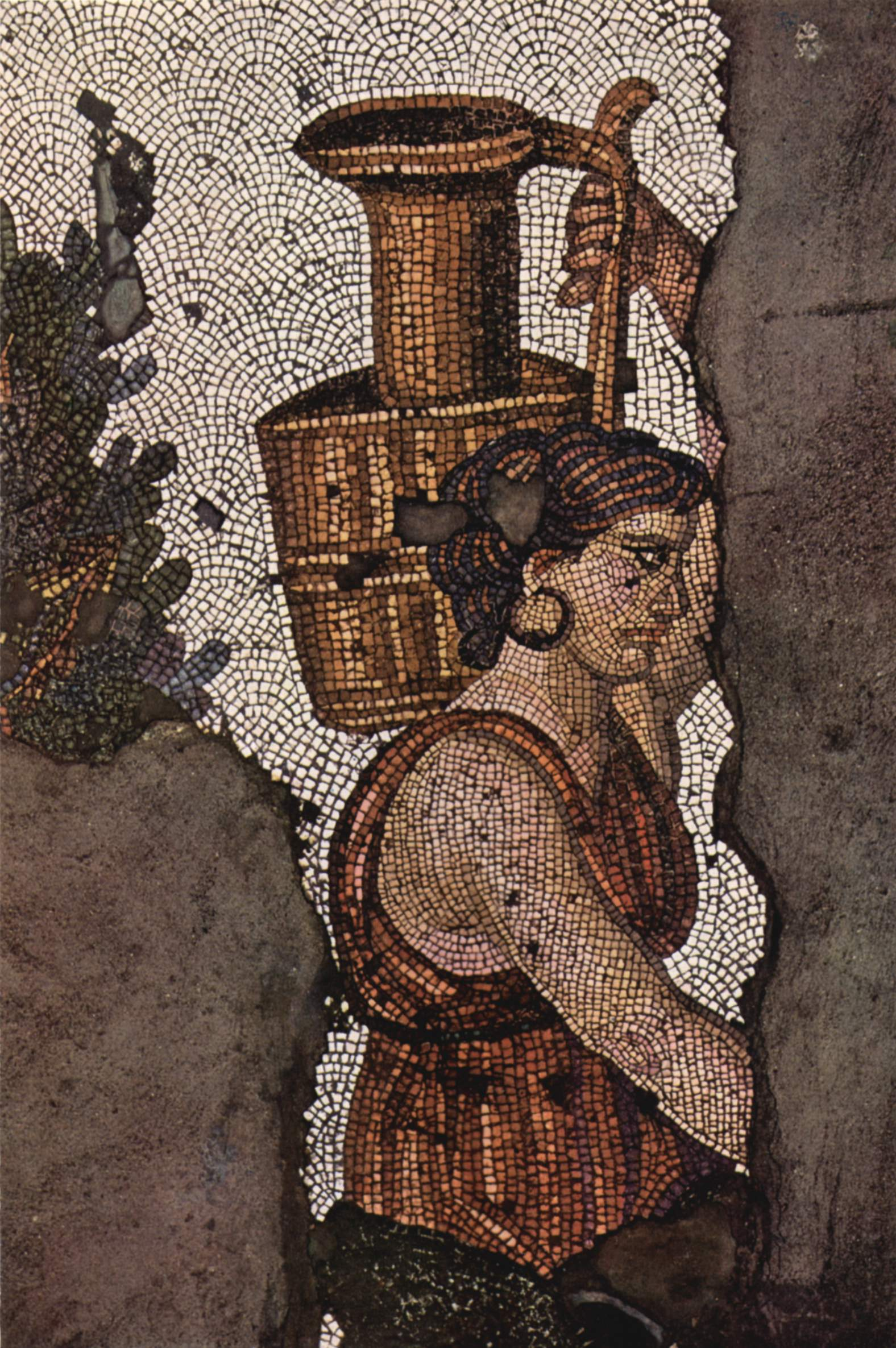
Floor mosaic of a woman carrying a pot (c. 5th century)

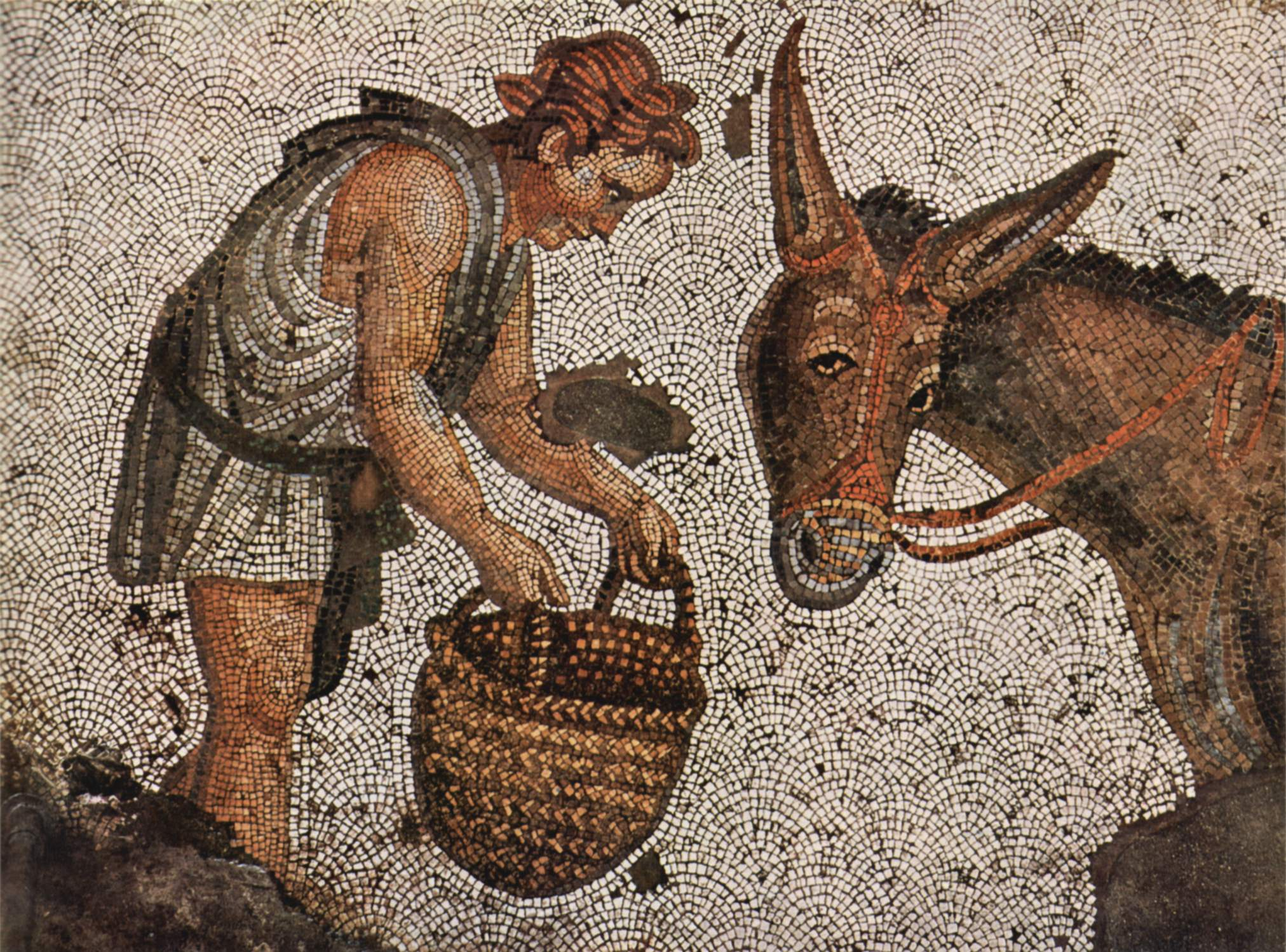
Floor mosaic of a child and a donkey (c. 5th century)

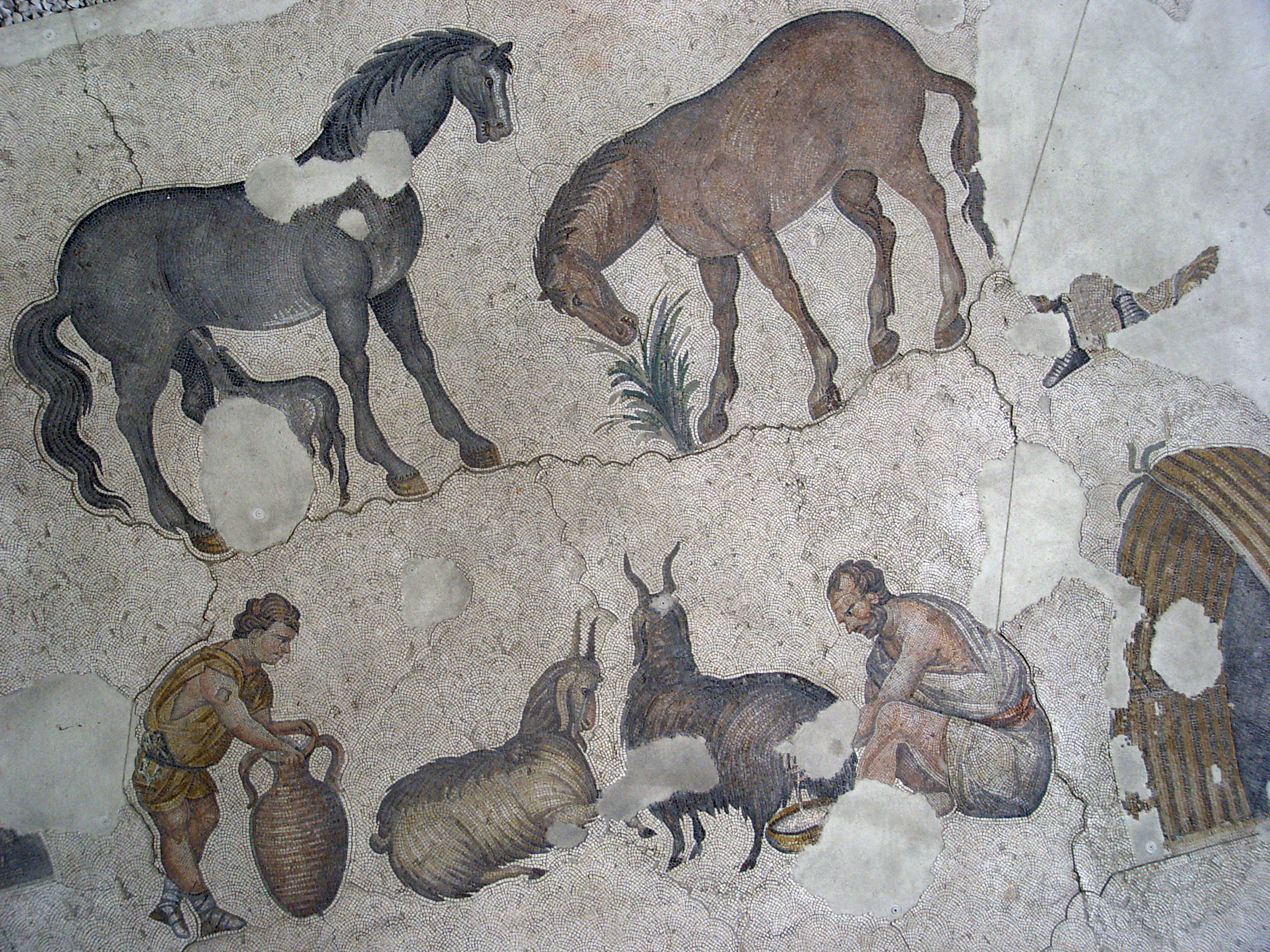
Shepherds with animals

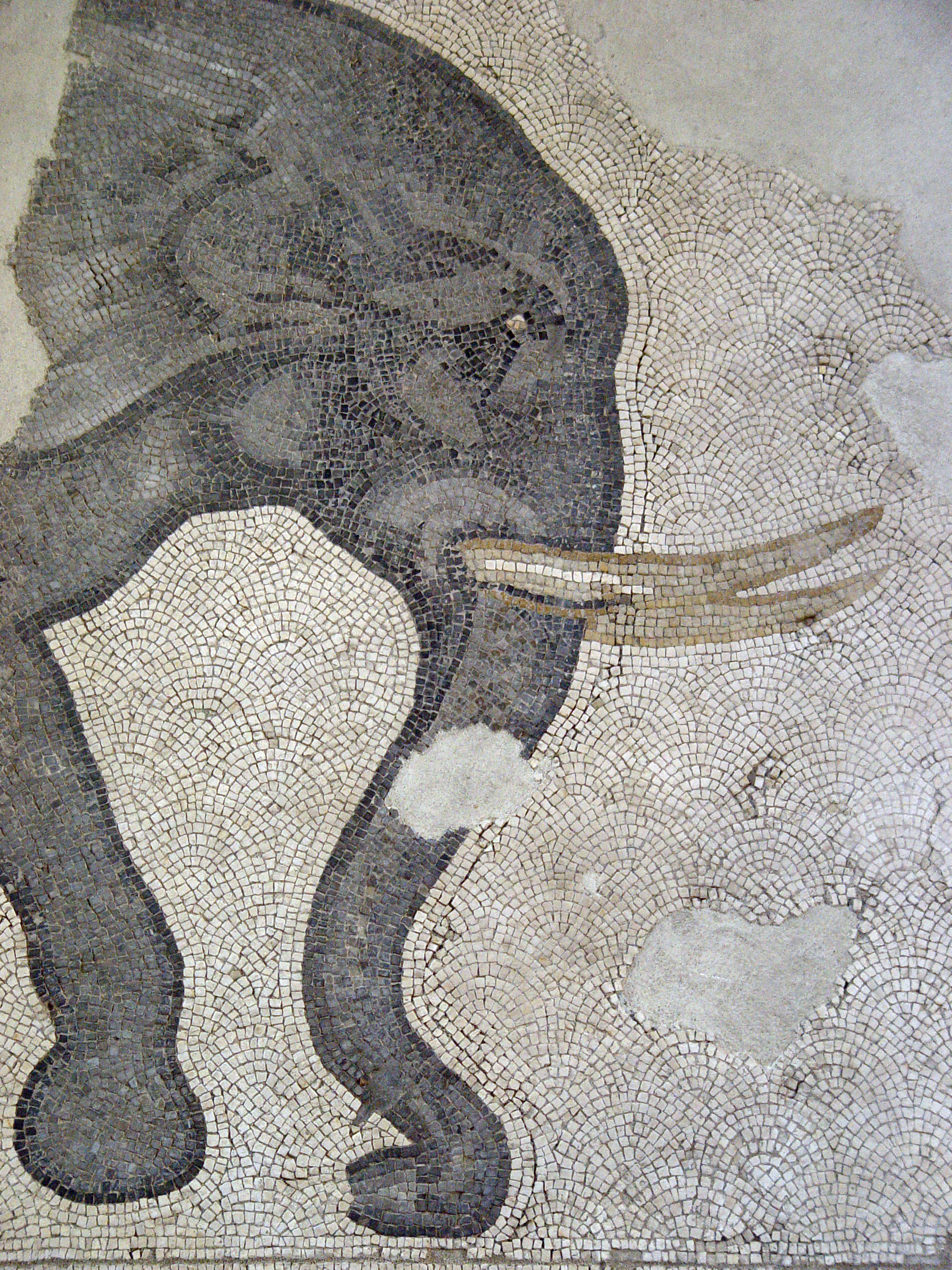
Elephant

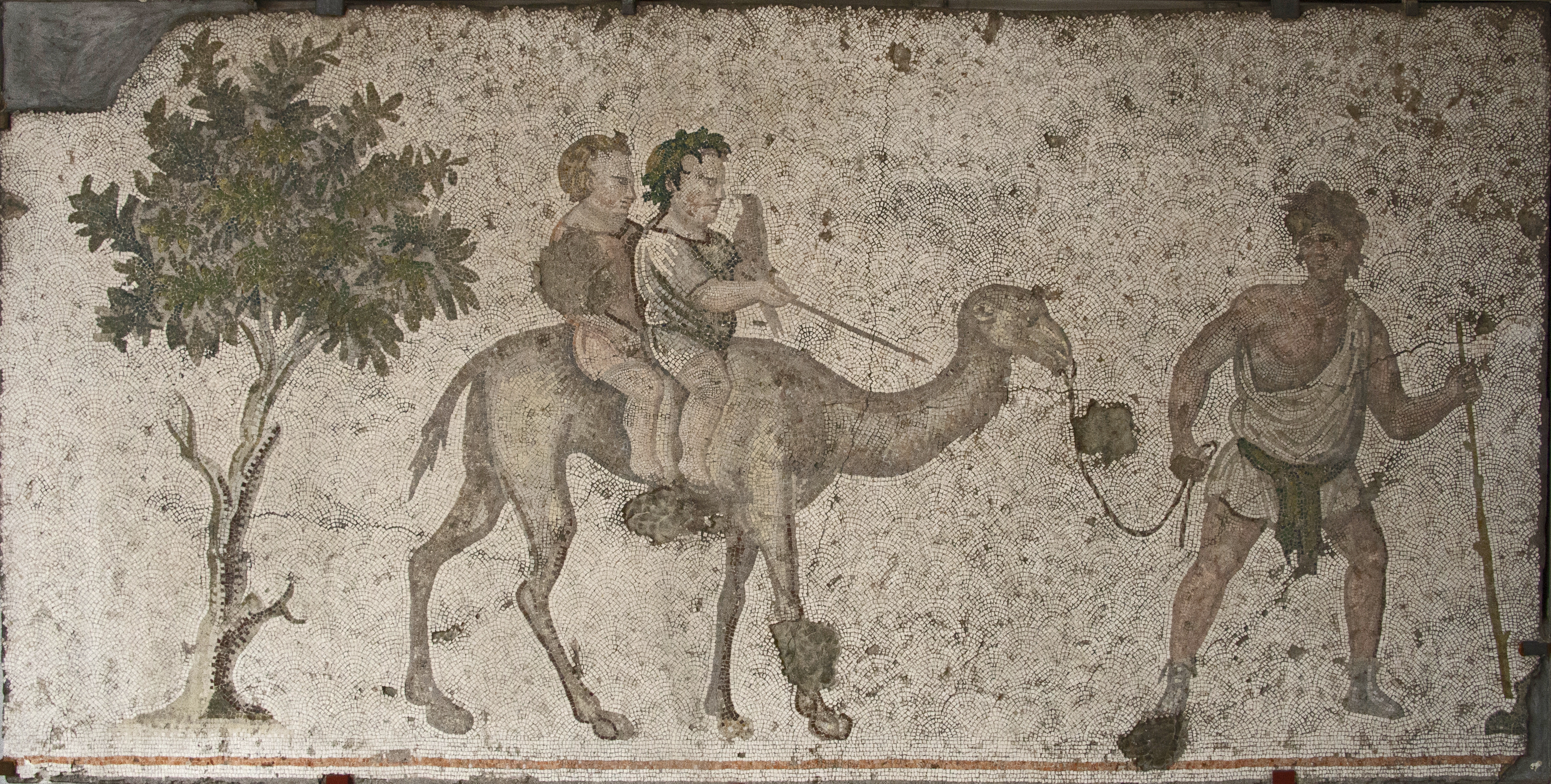
Dromedary ride

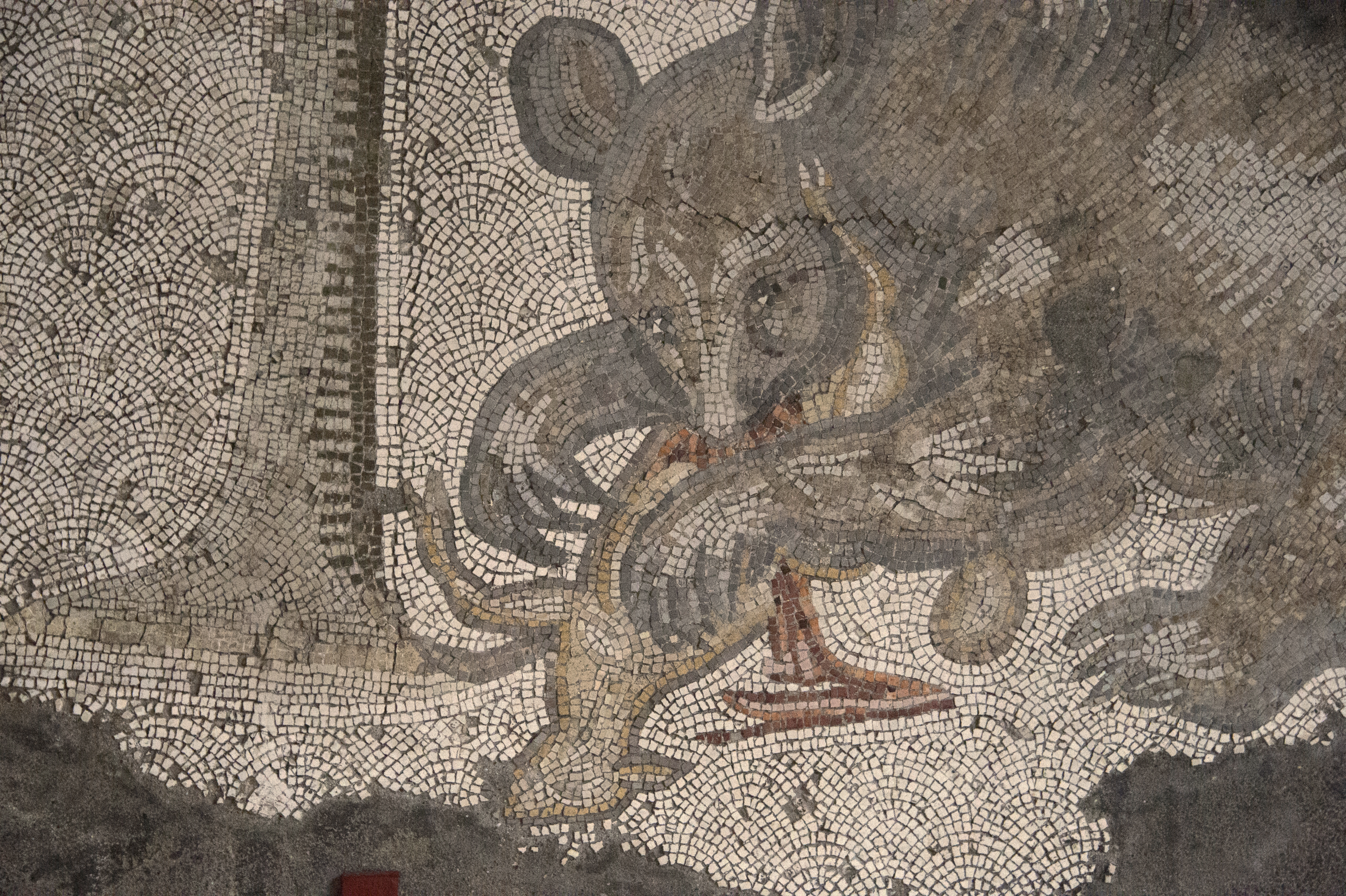
Bear with prey

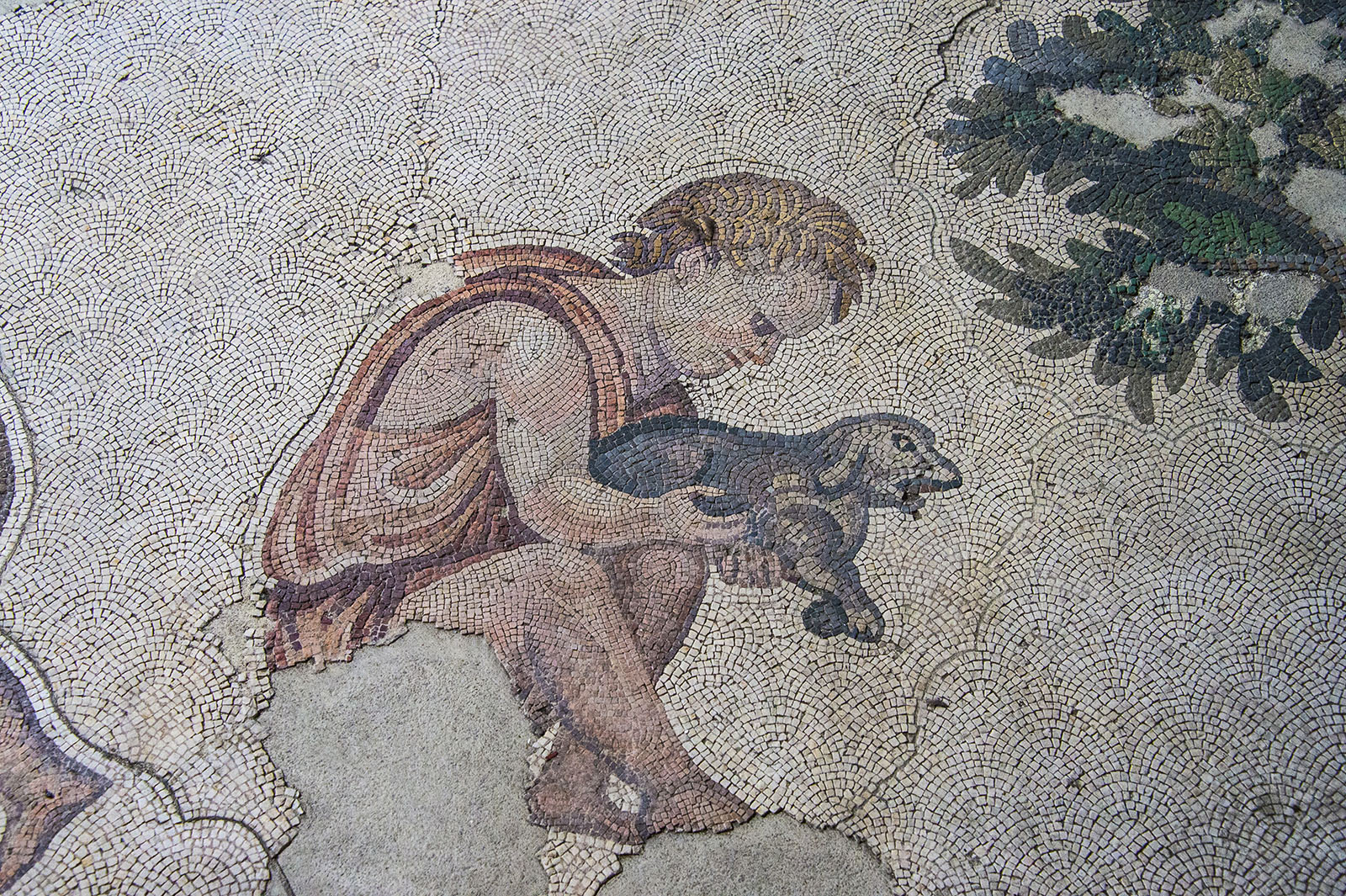
Boy and dog

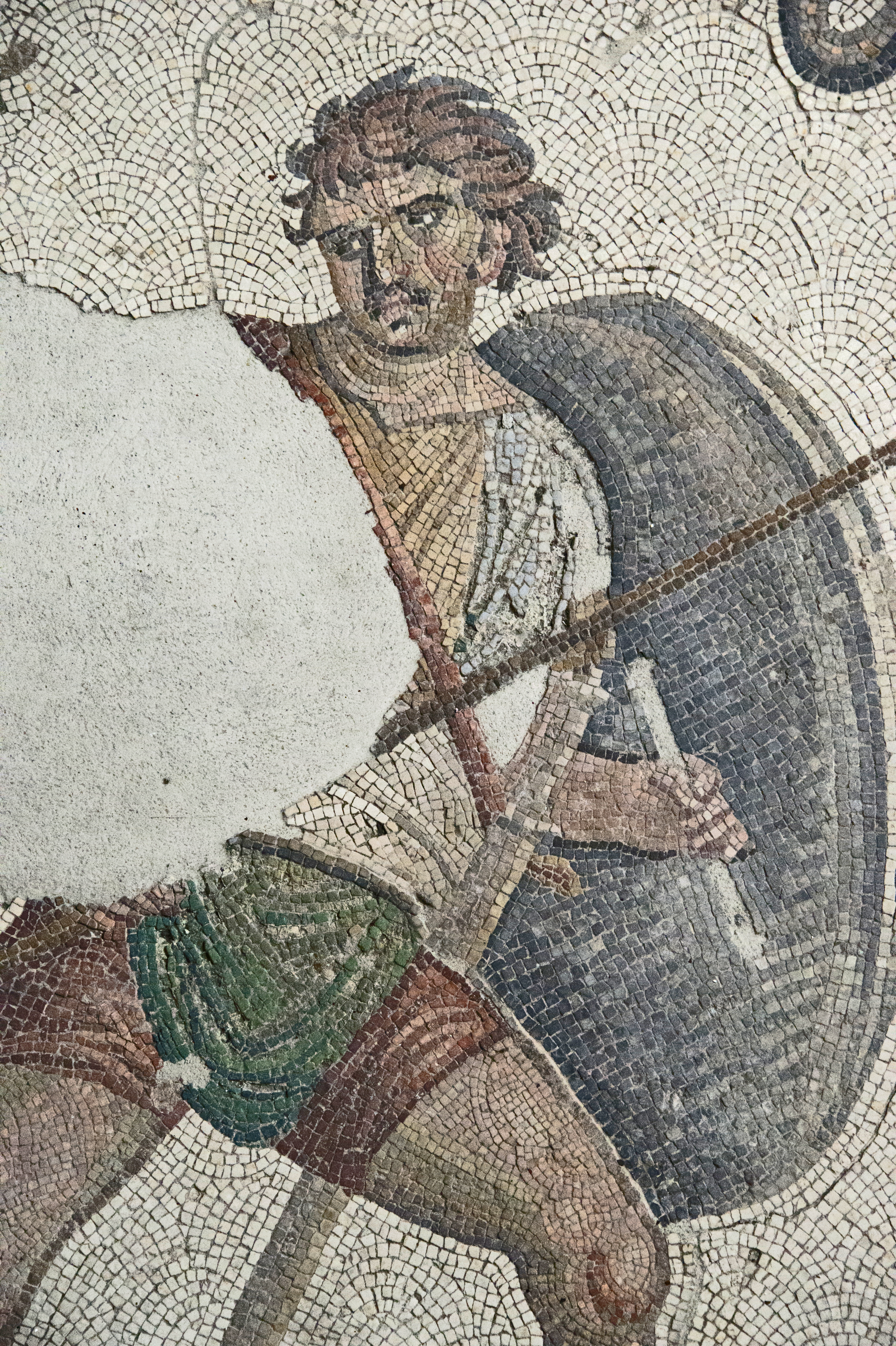
Hunt scene

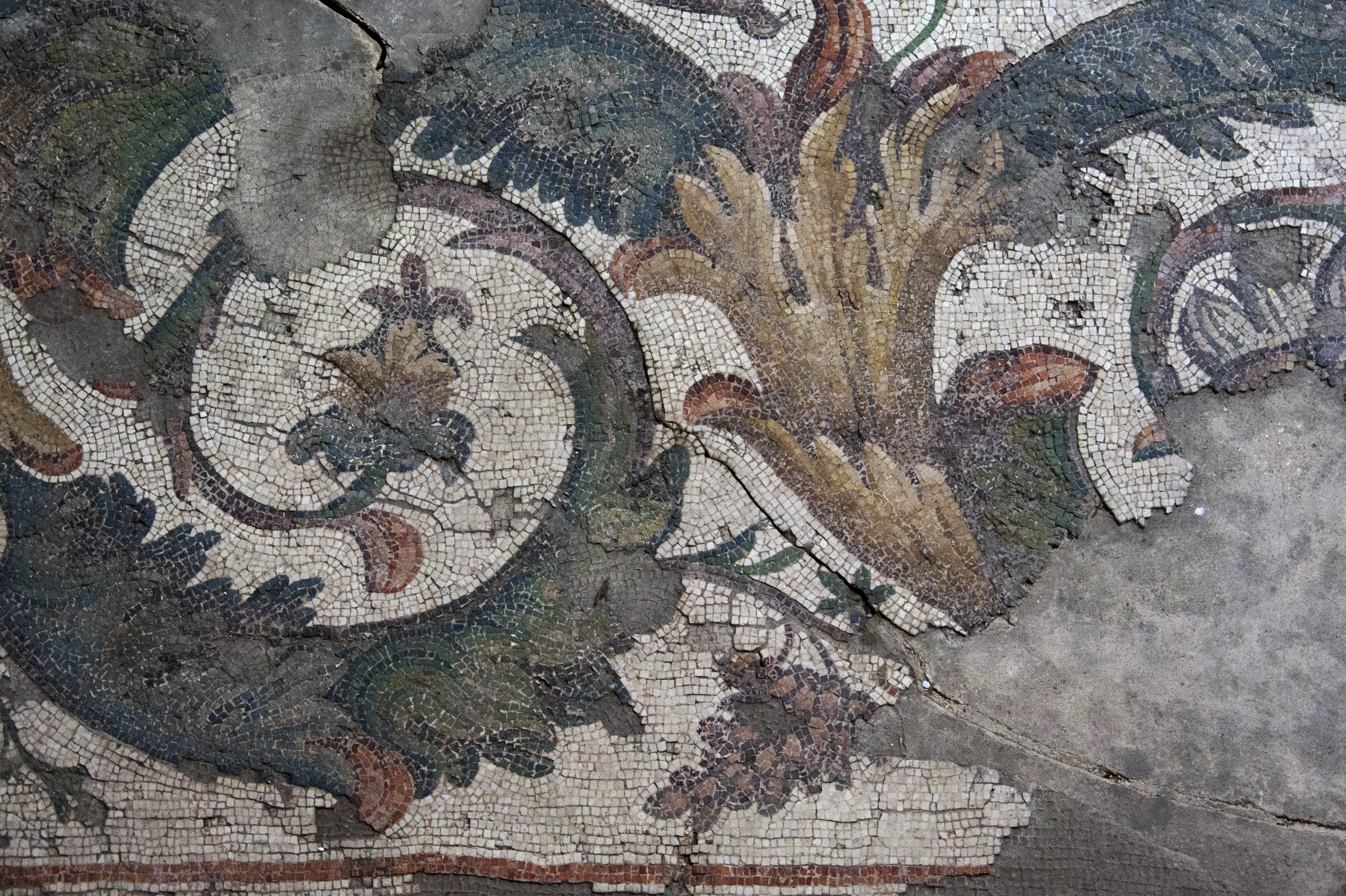
Decoration

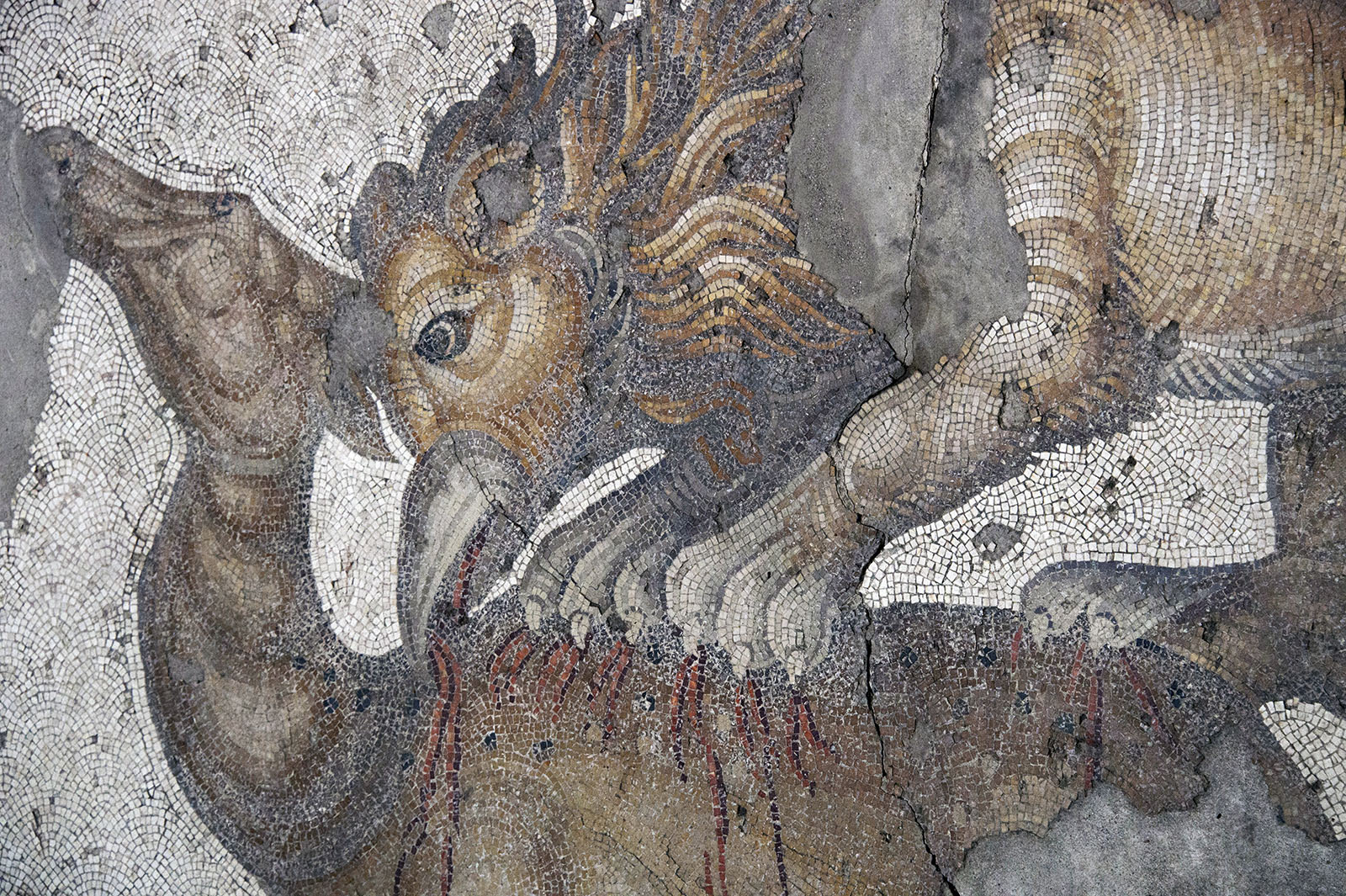
Griffon attack

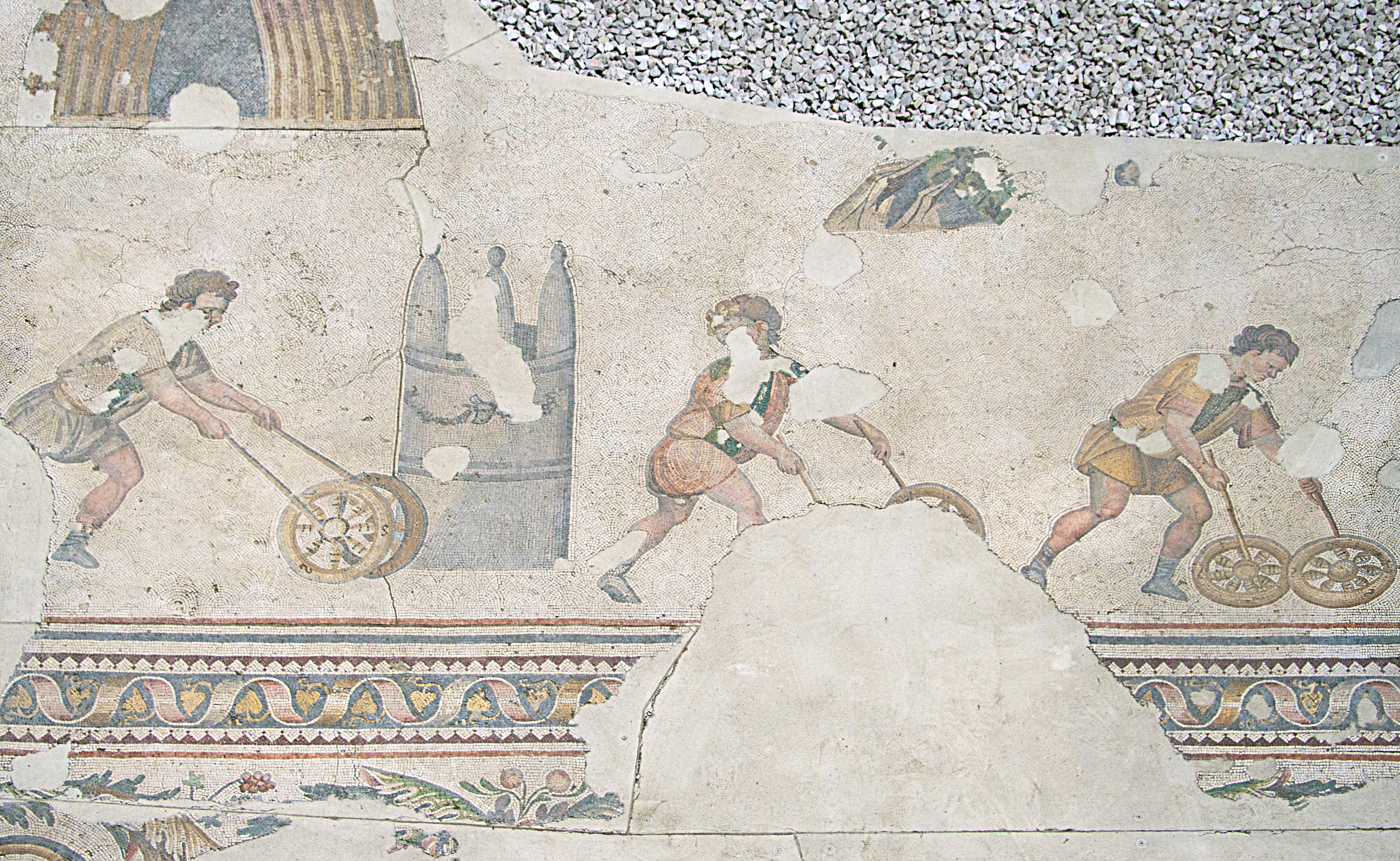
Arena play

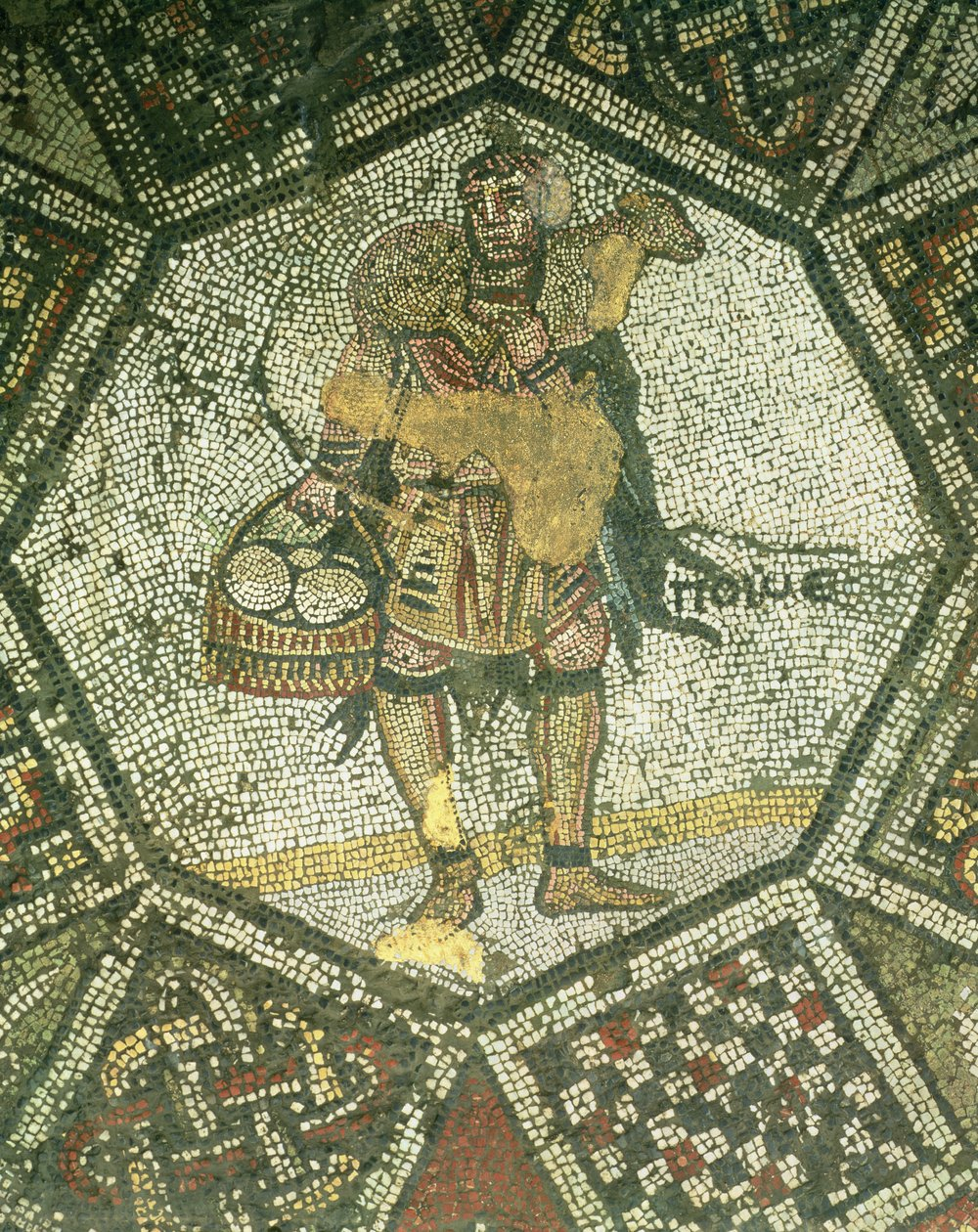
The Good Shepherd, carrying a lost sheep and possibly loaves of bread

== See also ==
- List of museums and monuments in Istanbul
- Hippodrome of Constantinople
- List of Intangible Cultural Heritage elements in Turkey
