= Constantinople =

Capital of the Byzantine and Ottoman Empires

- Κωνσταντινούπολις (Koine Greek); Constantinopolis (Latin)
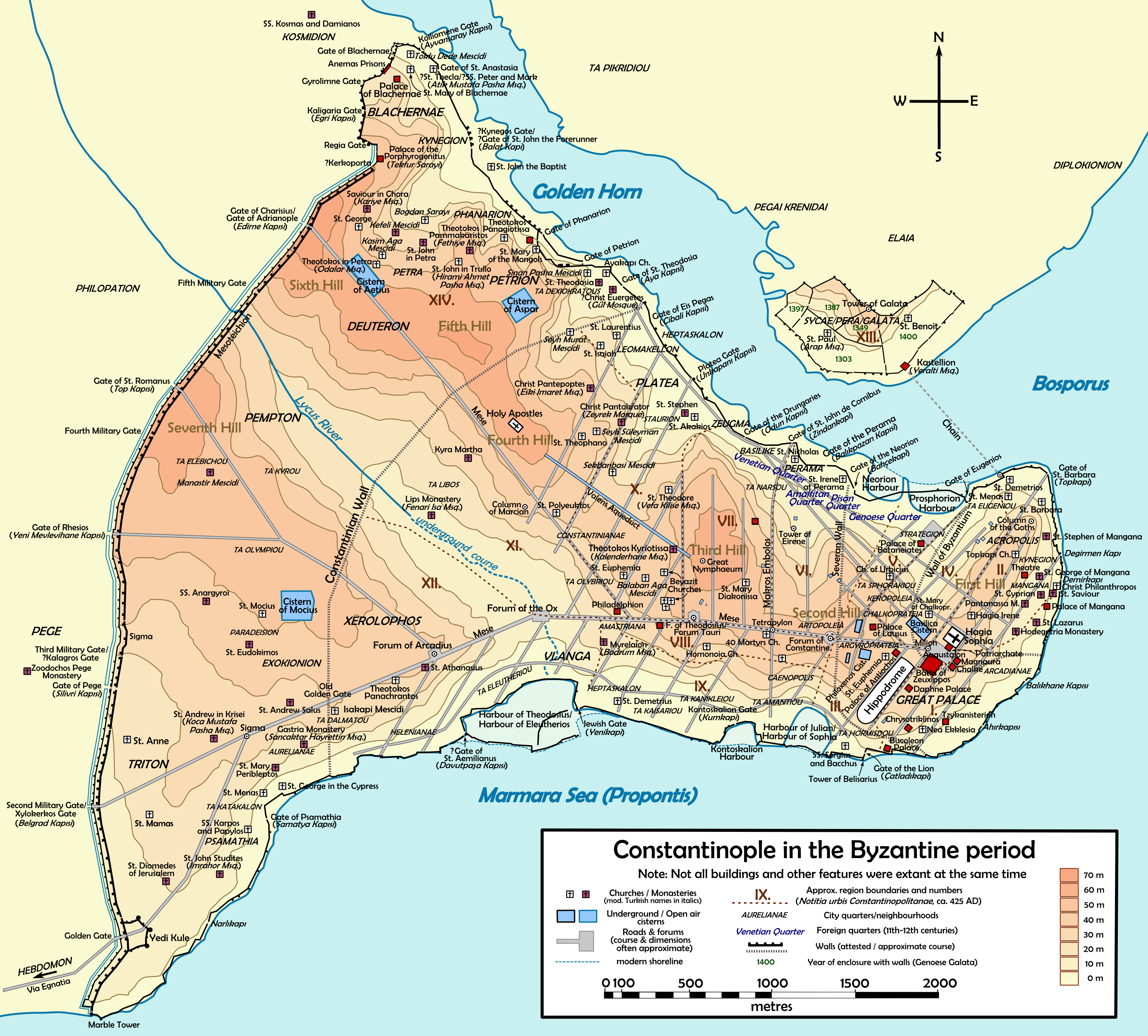
- Map of Constantinople in the Byzantine period, corresponding to the modern-day Fatih and Beyoğlu districts of Istanbul

- Location within Istanbul Location within Marmara Location within Turkey
- 41°00′45″N 28°58′48″E
- Type: Imperial city
- Periods: Late antiquity to 15th century
- Cultures: Greek; Latin; Byzantine
- Location: Fatih and Beyoğlu, Istanbul, Turkey
- Region: Marmara Region
- Part of: Roman Empire; Byzantine Empire; Latin Empire

History
- Built: 11 May 330
- Built by: Constantine the Great
- Events: Sieges of Constantinople, including fall of the city (1204 and 1453)

Site notes
- Area: 6 km^{2} (2.3 sq mi) enclosed within Constantinian Walls; 14 km^{2} (5.4 sq mi) enclosed within Theodosian Walls

UNESCO World Heritage Site
- Official name: Historic Areas of Istanbul
- Type: Cultural
- Criteria: (i), (ii), (iii), (iv)
- Designated: 1985 (9th session)
- Reference no.: 356bis
- Extension: 2017
- Area: 765.5 ha
- UNESCO region: Europe and North America

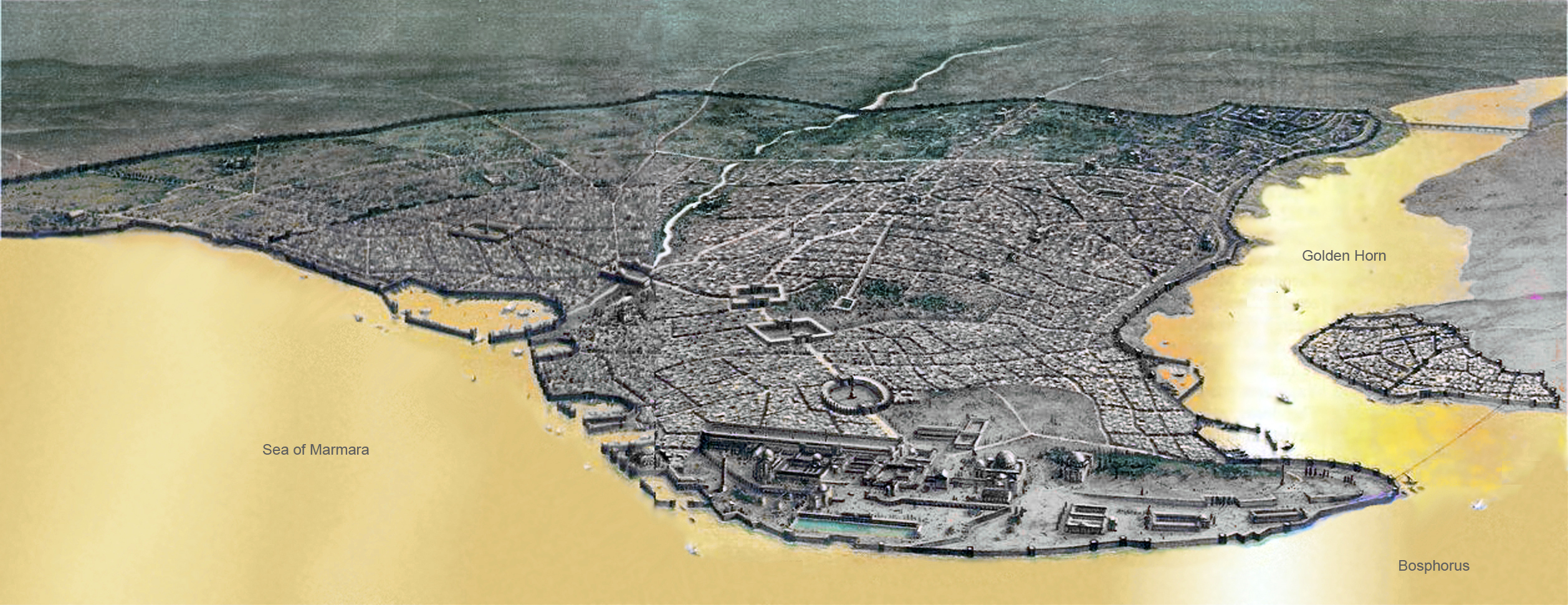
Aerial view of Byzantine Constantinople and the Propontis (Sea of Marmara)

Timeline of Constantinople
- Capital of the Byzantine Empire 395–1204 AD; 1261–1453 AD: 330 AD: Founding of Constantinople; c. 404/405–413 AD: Construction of the Theodosian walls; 474 AD: Great Fire of Constantinople; 532 AD: Nika riots and fire of Constantinople; 537 AD: Completion of the Hagia Sophia by Justinian I; 626 AD: First siege of Constantinople; 674–678 AD: First Arab siege of Constantinople; 717–718 AD: Second Arab siege of Constantinople; 1204 AD: Sack of Constantinople; 1261 AD: Reconquest of Constantinople; 1391 AD: First Ottoman siege of Constantinople; 1394–1402 AD: Second Ottoman siege of Constantinople; 1411 AD: Third Ottoman siege of Constantinople; 1422 AD: Fourth Ottoman siege of Constantinople; 1453 AD: Fall of Constantinople

Constantinople, (Note: English: /ˌkɒnstæntɪˈnoʊpəl/ KON-stan-tin-OH-pəl; Koine Greek: Κωνστᾰντῑνούπολῐς, romanized: Kōnstăntīnoúpolĭs, Medieval Greek pronunciation: [konstandiˈnupolis]; Latin: Cōnstantīnopolis, pronounced [kõːstantiːˈnɔpɔlɪs]; Ottoman Turkish: قسطنطینیه, romanized: Ḳosṭanṭīnīye.) the modern Istanbul, was the capital of the Roman Empire and Byzantine Empire from 330 until its takeover by the Ottoman Empire in 1453. After this, it continued to function as the Ottoman capital until the abolition of the Ottoman sultanate in 1922. It was located at the core of the modern city of Istanbul, on a peninsula at the southeastern tip of Thrace in Europe; with the Bosporus strait and the ancient cities of Chalcedon and Chrysopolis in Bithynia, Anatolia (Asia Minor) to the east; the Golden Horn and the citadel of Galata (Pera) to the north; the Sea of Marmara to the south; and the Princes' Islands to the southeast.

Constantinople was founded on the site of the existing city of Byzantium in 324, during the reign of Constantine the Great, initially as Nova Roma ("New Rome"). In 330 it became the new eastern capital of the Roman Empire, and remained as the sole capital of the empire after the western parts were lost in the 5th century. The ascendancy of Constantinople marks the empire's "Byzantine" era.

From the mid-5th century to the early 13th century, Constantinople was the largest and wealthiest city in Europe. The city became famous for its architectural masterpieces, such as Hagia Sophia (a cathedral), the Imperial Palace of the emperors, the Hippodrome, the Golden Gate of the Land Walls, and opulent aristocratic palaces. The University of Constantinople was founded in the 5th century and included a vast Imperial Library, which contained more than 100,000 volumes.

Constantinople was famous for its massive and complex fortifications, which ranked among the most sophisticated defensive architecture of antiquity; the Theodosian walls consisted of a double wall lying about 2 kilometres (1.2 mi) to the west of the first wall and a moat with palisades in front. Constantinople's location between the Golden Horn and the Sea of Marmara reduced the land area that required defensive walls. The city was constructed intentionally to rival Rome, and it was claimed that several elevations within its walls matched Rome's seven hills. The defenses enclosed magnificent palaces, domes, and towers, the result of the prosperity Constantinople achieved as the gateway between two continents (Europe and Asia) and two seas (the Mediterranean and the Black Sea). Although besieged on numerous occasions by various armies, the defenses of Constantinople proved impenetrable for nearly nine hundred years.

In 1204, during the Fourth Crusade, the city was sacked by the Latin Crusaders and became the capital of the short-lived Latin Empire (1204–1261). The Byzantine Empire of Nicaea recaptured the city in 1261. Under the following Palaiologan dynasty it enjoyed a partial recovery. With the advent of the Ottoman Empire in 1299, the empire's territories dwindled, and the city began to lose population. By the early 15th century, the empire was reduced to just Constantinople and its environs, along with the territories of the despotate of Morea, in Peloponnese, Greece, making it an enclave inside the Ottoman Empire. The city was finally besieged and conquered by the Ottoman Empire in 1453. It served as the Ottoman capital until the empire's dissolution and the establishment of the Republic of Turkey in 1923, when the capital was moved to Ankara. Now known internationally under its modern Turkish name Istanbul, it has become the most populous city in Europe, with a population of more than 16 million residents, and the economic and financial centre of Turkey, straddling the Bosporus strait and lying in both Europe and Asia.

== Names ==
Before Constantine I, the city was known as Byzantium (Greek Byzantion), the name associated with its original foundation as a Greek colony in the 7th century BC. It was briefly renamed Augusta Antonina in the early 3rd century AD by the Emperor Septimius Severus (193–211), who had razed it to the ground during the civil war of 196 AD, and then had it rebuilt in honour of his son Marcus Aurelius Antoninus, the future Emperor Caracalla. The name appears to have been quickly forgotten and abandoned, and the city reverted to Byzantium after either the assassination of Caracalla in 217 or, at the latest, the fall of the Severan dynasty in 235.

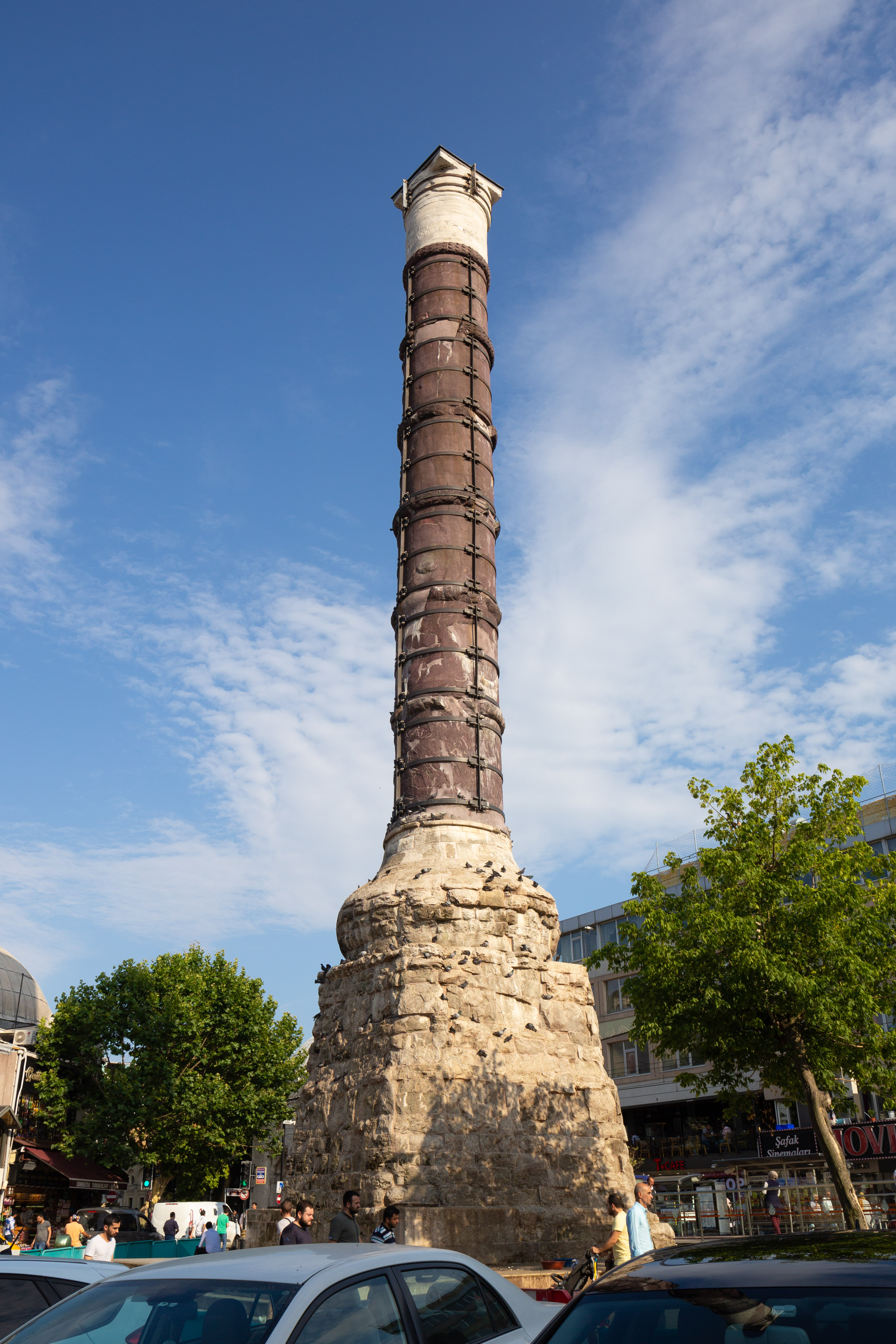
The Column of Constantine, built by Constantine I in 330 to commemorate the establishment of Constantinople as the new capital of the Roman Empire

When Constantine transferred the capital of the empire to his newly refounded city in 330, he initially designated it "New Rome" (Nova Roma, Νέα Ῥώμη). During this time, it was also called 'Second Rome', 'Eastern Rome', and Roma Constantinopolitana ('Constantinopolitan Rome'). However, it soon became more widely known as Constantinople (Greek: Κωνσταντινούπολις, romanized: Kōnstantinoupolis, lit. 'city of Constantine') in honour of its founder.

As the city became the sole remaining capital of the Roman Empire after the fall of the West, and its wealth, population, and influence grew, the city also came to have a multitude of by-names, such as Basileuousa (Queen of Cities) and Megalopolis (the Great City). In colloquial speech, it was commonly referred to as just i Polis (ἡ Πόλις) 'the City' by Constantinopolitans and provincial Byzantines alike.

This designation was also the source of what was to become the city's modern Turkish name, Istanbul. It is derived from the Greek phrase eis tin Polin (εἰς τὴν Πόλιν, or in its spoken form in Medieval Greek: stin Poli(n) στην Πόλι(ν), both meaning 'in the City'. Variants of this name are first attested in languages such as Armenian and Arabic from the 10th century, before the name was adopted also by the Ottoman Turks.

During the Ottoman era, the city was referred to either as Istanbul or, in more elevated registers, as Kostantiniyye (قسطنطینیه), originally an Arabic calque of "Constantinople" meaning "city of Constantine". At some times during the Ottoman era, an adaptation of "Istanbul" as "Islambol" (meaning "full of Islam") was also common. Western languages mostly continued to refer to the city as Constantinople until the early 20th century. After 1930, the government of modern Turkey began to urge other countries to use Turkish names for Turkish cities, and the city came to be known as Istanbul and its variations in most world languages.

== History ==
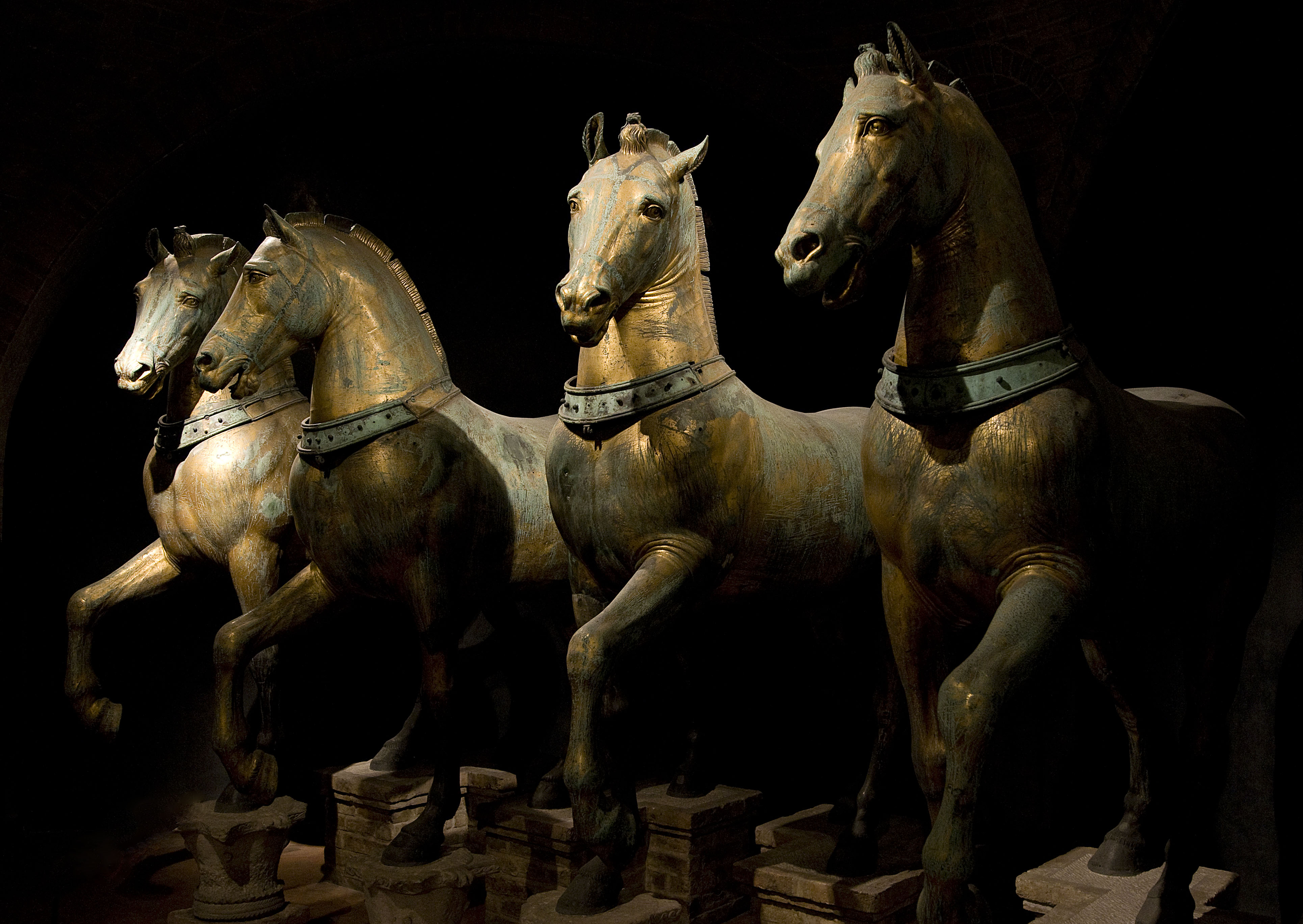
The four bronze horses that were once in the Hippodrome of Constantinople are today put on display in Venice.

=== Foundation of Byzantium ===
Constantinople was founded by the Roman emperor Constantine I (272–337) in 324 on the site of an already-existing city, Byzantium (Ancient Greek: Βυζάντιον, romanized: Byzántion), which was settled in the early days of Greek colonial expansion, around 657 BC, by colonists of the city-state of Megara, across from the town of Chalcedon on the Asiatic side of the Bosphorus.

Hesychius of Miletus wrote that some "claim that people from Megara, who derived their descent from Nisos, sailed to this place under their leader Byzas, and invented the fable that his name was attached to the city." Some versions of the founding myth say Byzas was the son of a local nymph, while others say he was conceived by one of Zeus' daughters and Poseidon. Hesychius also gives alternate versions of the city's founding legend, which he attributed to old poets and writers:

It is said that the first Argives, after having received this prophecy from Pythia,
Blessed are those who will inhabit that holy city,
a narrow strip of the Thracian shore at the mouth of the Pontos,
where two pups drink of the gray sea,
where fish and stag graze on the same pasture,
set up their dwellings at the place where the rivers Kydaros and Barbyses have their estuaries, one flowing from the north, the other from the west, and merging with the sea at the altar of the nymph called Semestre"

The city maintained independence as a city-state until it was annexed by Darius I in 512 BC into the Persian Empire, as he considered the site the optimal location to construct a pontoon bridge crossing into Europe, given that Byzantium was situated at the narrowest point in the Bosphorus strait. Persian rule lasted until 478 BC, when, as part of the Greek counterattack to the Second Persian invasion of Greece, a Greek army led by the Spartan general Pausanias captured the city, which remained an independent, yet subordinate, city under the Athenians, and later to the Spartans after 411 BC. A farsighted treaty with the emergent power of Rome in c. 150 BC, which stipulated tribute in exchange for independent status allowed it to enter Roman rule unscathed. This treaty would pay dividends retrospectively as Byzantium would maintain this independent status, and prosper under peace and stability in the Pax Romana for nearly three centuries until the late 2nd century AD.

Byzantium was never a major influential city-state like Athens, Corinth, or Sparta; however, on the other hand, the city enjoyed relative peace and steady growth as a prosperous trading city due to its fortunate location. The site lay astride the land route from Europe to Asia and the seaway from the Black Sea to the Mediterranean, and had in the Golden Horn an excellent and spacious harbor. Already then, in Greek and early Roman times, Byzantium was famous for the strategic geographic position that made it difficult to besiege and capture, and its position at the crossroads of the Asiatic-European trade route over land and as the gateway between the Mediterranean and Black Seas made it too valuable a settlement to abandon, as Emperor Septimius Severus later realized when he razed the city to the ground for supporting Pescennius Niger's claimancy. It was a move greatly criticized by the contemporary consul and historian Cassius Dio, who stated that Severus had destroyed "a strong Roman outpost and a base of operations against the barbarians from Pontus and Asia." He would later rebuild Byzantium towards the end of his reign, in which it would be briefly renamed Augusta Antonina, fortifying it with a new city wall in his name, the Severan Wall.

=== 324–337: The refoundation as Constantinople ===
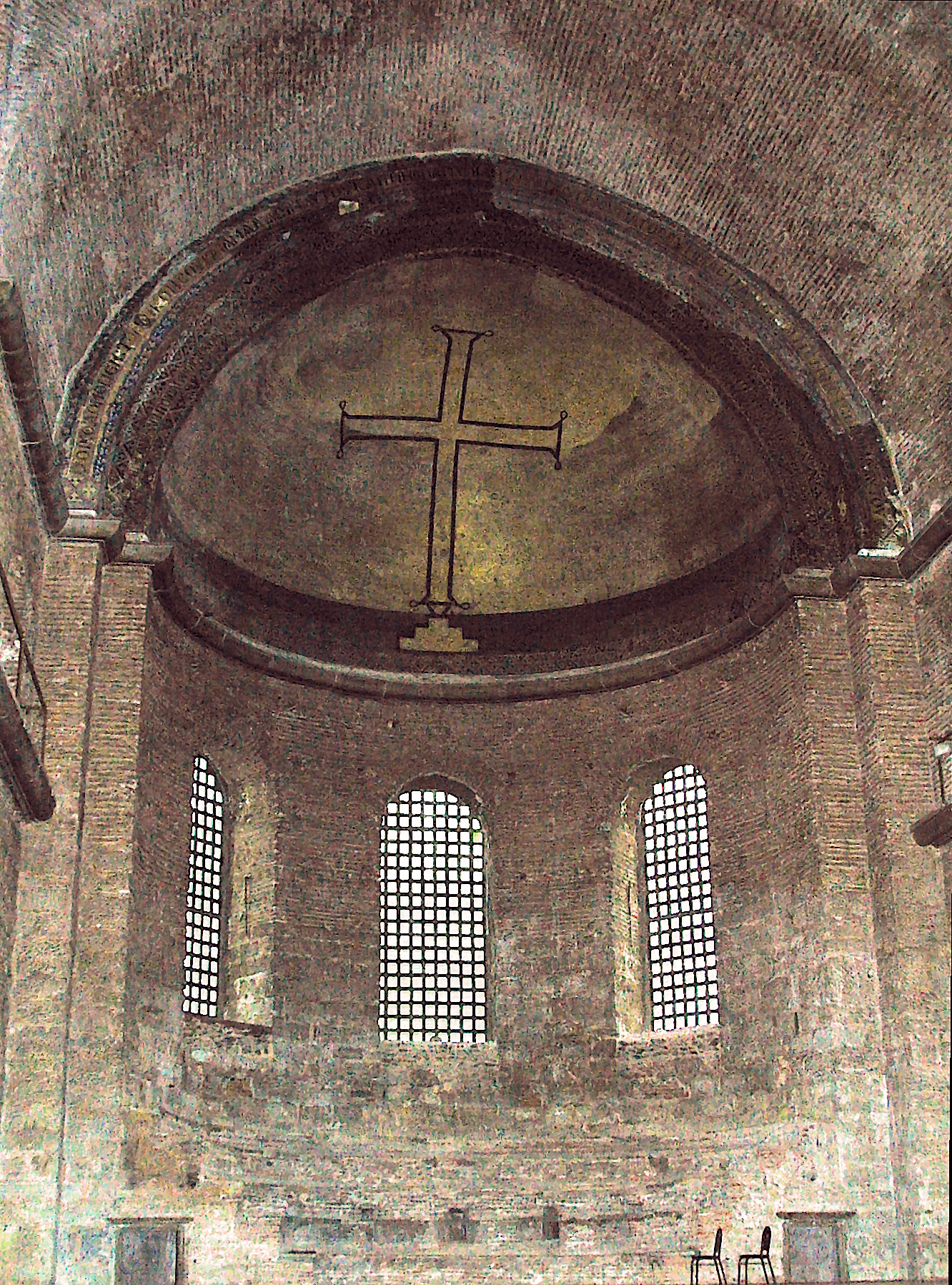
A simple cross: an example of iconoclast art in the Hagia Irene Church in Istanbul, which was secularized and today serves as a museum and concert hall.

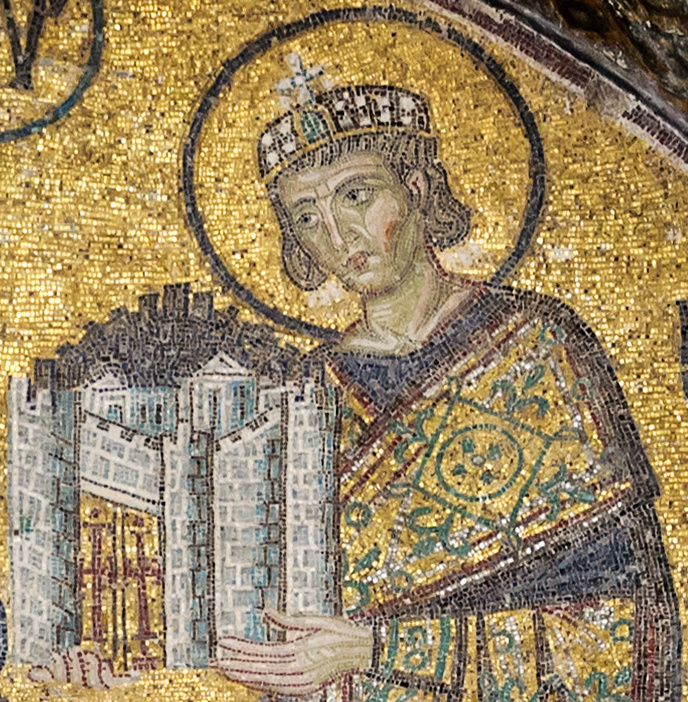
Emperor Constantine I presents a representation of the city of Constantinople as tribute to an enthroned Mary and Christ Child in this church mosaic. Hagia Sophia, c. 1000.

Constantine had altogether more colorful plans. Having restored the unity of the Empire and, being in the course of major governmental reforms as well as of sponsoring the consolidation of the Christian church, he was well aware that Rome was an unsatisfactory capital. Rome was too far from the frontiers, and hence from the armies and the imperial courts, and it offered an undesirable playground for disaffected politicians. Yet it had been the capital of the state for over a thousand years, and it might have seemed unthinkable to suggest that the capital be moved to a different location. Nevertheless, Constantine identified the site of Byzantium as the right place: a place where an emperor could sit, readily defended, with easy access to the Danube or the Euphrates frontiers, his court supplied from the rich gardens and sophisticated workshops of Roman Asia, his treasuries filled by the wealthiest provinces of the Empire.

Constantinople was built over six years and ceremonially consecrated on 11 May 330. Constantine divided the expanded city, like Rome, into 14 regions, and ornamented it with public works worthy of an imperial metropolis. Yet, at first, Constantine's new Rome did not have all the dignities of old Rome. It possessed a proconsul, rather than an urban prefect. It had no praetors, tribunes, or quaestors. Although it did have senators, they held the title clarus, not clarissimus, like those of Rome. It also lacked the panoply of other administrative offices regulating the food supply, police, statues, temples, sewers, aqueducts, or other public works. The new program of building was carried out in great haste: columns, marbles, doors, and tiles were taken wholesale from the temples of the empire and moved to the new city. In a similar fashion, many of the greatest works of Greek and Roman art were soon to be seen in its squares and streets. The emperor stimulated private building by promising householders gifts of land from the imperial estates in Asiana and Pontica and, on 18 May 332, he announced that, as in Rome, free distributions of food would be made to the citizens. At the time, the amount is said to have been 80,000 rations a day, doled out from 117 distribution points around the city.

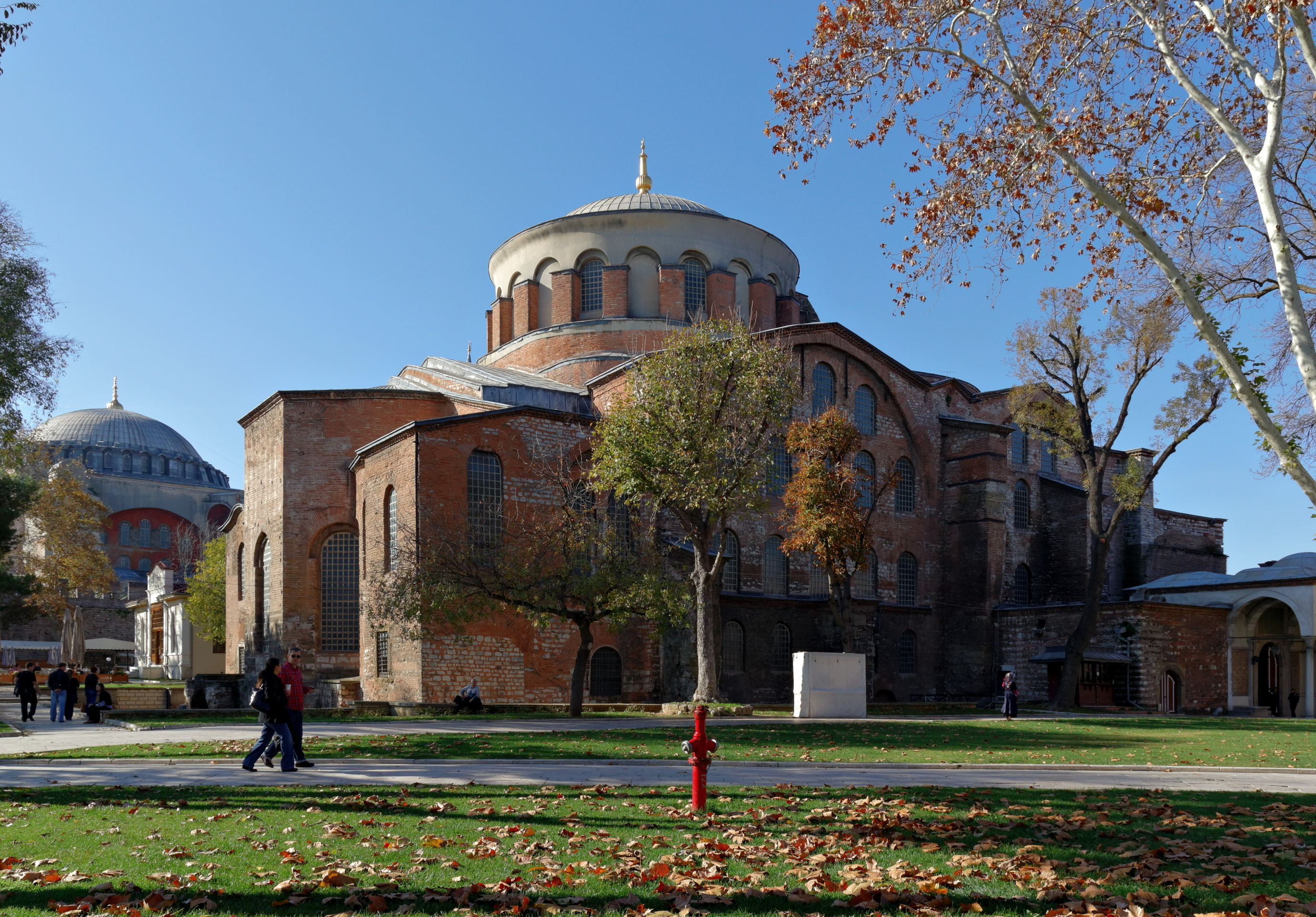
Hagia Irene is a Greek Eastern Orthodox Church located in the outer courtyard of Topkapı Palace in Istanbul. It is one of the few churches in Istanbul that has not been converted into a mosque.

Constantine laid out a new square at the center of old Byzantium, naming it the Augustaion (Greek: Augustaeum). The new senate-house (or Curia) was housed in a basilica on the east side. On the south side of the great square was erected the Great Palace of the Emperor with its imposing entrance, the Chalke, and its ceremonial suite known as the Palace of Daphne. Nearby was the vast Hippodrome for chariot races, seating over 80,000 spectators, and the famed Baths of Zeuxippus. At the western entrance to the Augustaion was the Milion, a vaulted monument from which distances were measured across the Roman Empire.

From the Augustaion led a great street, the Mese, lined with colonnades. As it descended the First Hill of the city and climbed the Second Hill, it passed on the left the Praetorium or law-court. Then it passed through the oval Forum of Constantine, where there was a second Senate-house and a high column with a statue of Constantine himself in the guise of Helios, crowned with a halo of seven rays and looking toward the rising sun. From there, the Mese passed on and through the Forum Tauri and then the Forum Bovis, and finally up the Seventh Hill (or Xerolophus) and through to the Golden Gate in the Constantinian Wall. After the construction of the Theodosian walls in the early 5th century, it was extended to the new Golden Gate, reaching a total length of seven Roman miles. After the construction of the Theodosian Walls, Constantinople consisted of an area approximately the size of Old Rome within the Aurelian walls, or some 1,400 ha.

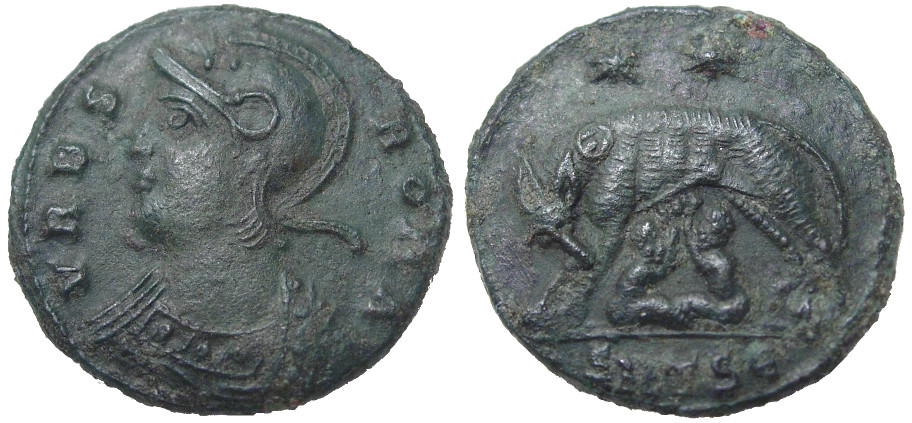
Another coin struck by Constantine I in 330–333 to commemorate the foundation of Constantinople and to also reaffirm Rome as the traditional center of the Roman Empire

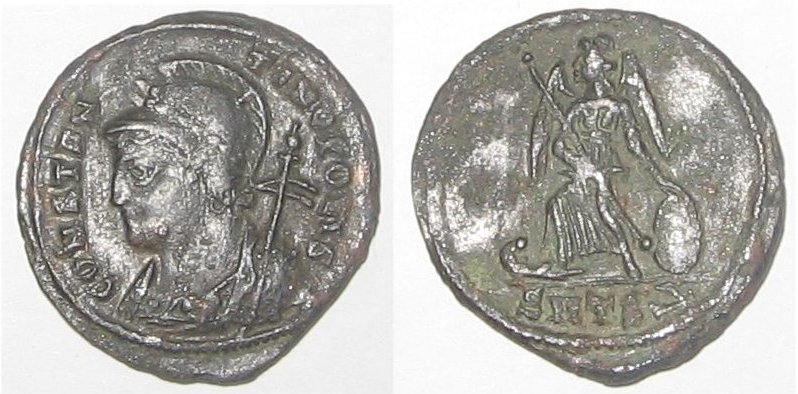
Coin struck by Constantine I to commemorate the founding of Constantinople.

=== 337–529: Constantinople during the Barbarian Invasions and the fall of the West ===
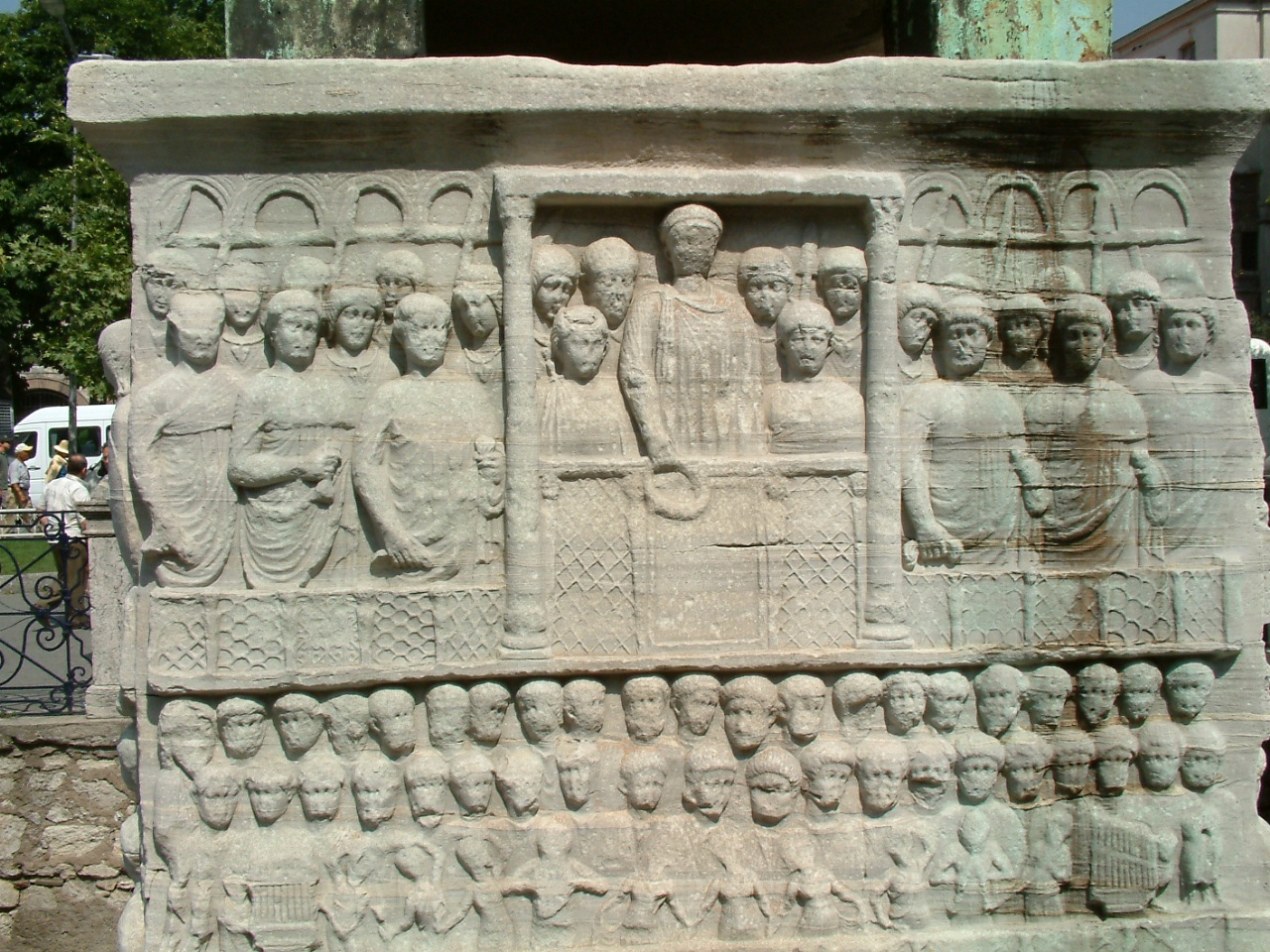
Theodosius I was the last Roman emperor who ruled over an undivided empire (detail from the Obelisk at the Hippodrome of Constantinople).

The importance of Constantinople increased, but it was gradual. From the death of Constantine in 337 to the accession of Theodosius I, emperors had been resident only in the years 337–338, 347–351, 358–361, 368–369. Its status as a capital was recognized by the appointment of the first known Urban Prefect of the City Honoratus, who held office from 11 December 359 until 361. The urban prefects had concurrent jurisdiction over three provinces each in the adjacent dioceses of Thrace (in which the city was located), Pontus, and Asia, comparable to the 100-mile extraordinary jurisdiction of the prefect of Rome. The emperor Valens, who hated the city and spent only one year there, nevertheless built the Palace of Hebdomon on the shore of the Propontis near the Golden Gate, probably for use when reviewing troops. All the emperors up to Zeno and Basiliscus were crowned and acclaimed at the Hebdomon. Theodosius I founded the Church of John the Baptist to house the skull of the saint (today preserved at the Topkapı Palace), put up a memorial pillar to himself in the Forum of Taurus, and turned the ruined temple of Aphrodite into a coach house for the Praetorian Prefect; Arcadius constructed a new forum named after himself on the Mese, near the walls of Constantine.

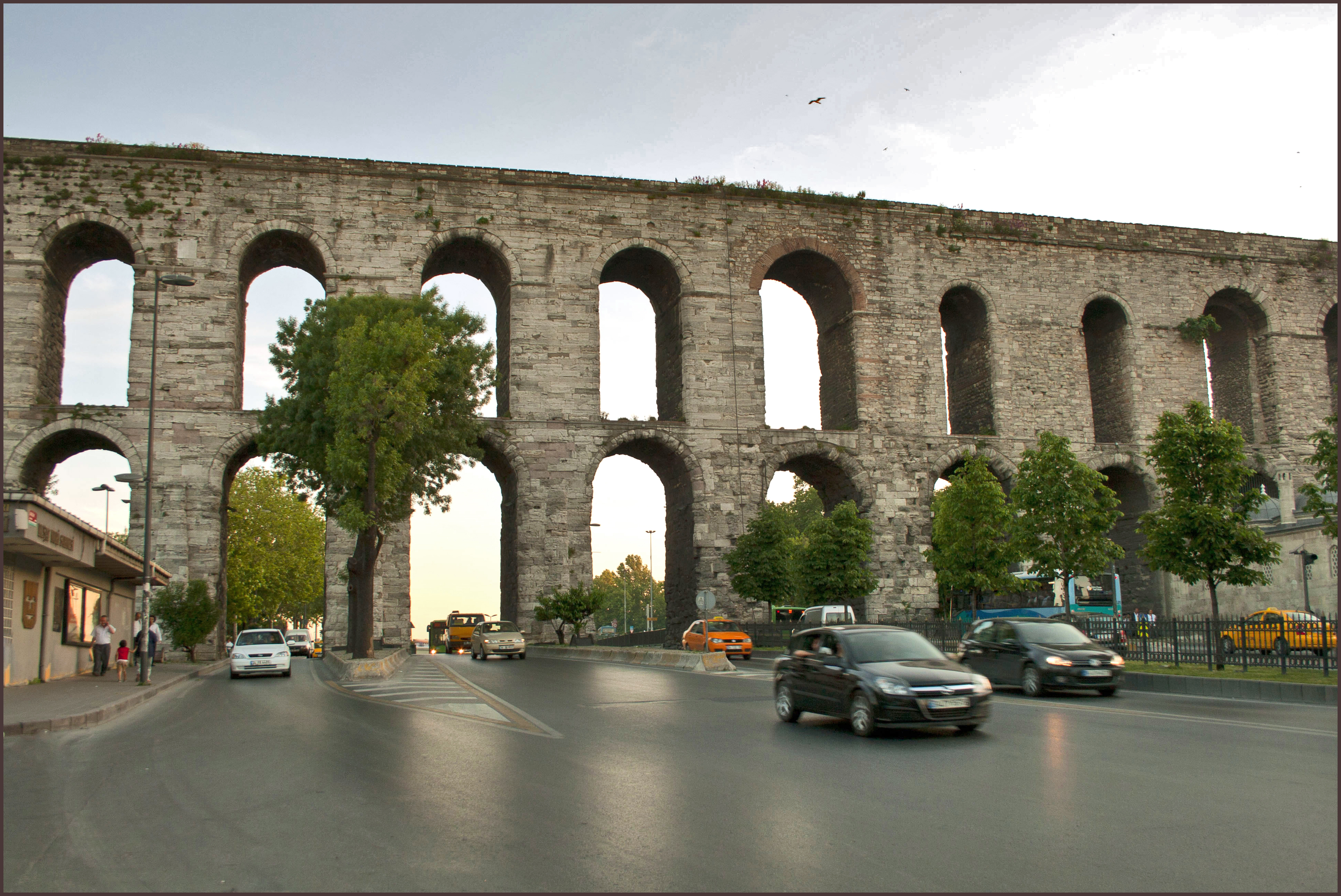
Aqueduct of Valens, completed by Roman emperor Valens in the late 4th century AD

After the shock of the Battle of Adrianople in 378, in which Valens and the flower of the Roman armies were destroyed by the Visigoths within a few days' march, the city looked to its defences, and in 413–414 Theodosius II built the 18-metre (60-foot)-tall triple-wall fortifications, which were not to be breached until the coming of gunpowder. Theodosius also founded a University near the Forum of Taurus on 27 February 425.

Uldin, a prince of the Huns, appeared on the Danube about this time and advanced into Thrace, but he was deserted by many of his followers, who joined with the Romans in driving their king back north of the river. Subsequently, several new walls were erected to defend the city, and the fleet on the Danube was improved.

After the barbarians overran the Western Roman Empire, Constantinople became the indisputable capital city of the Roman Empire. Emperors were no longer peripatetic between various court capitals and palaces. They remained in their palace in the Great City and sent generals to command their armies. The wealth of the eastern Mediterranean and western Asia flowed into Constantinople.

=== 527–565: Constantinople in the Age of Justinian ===
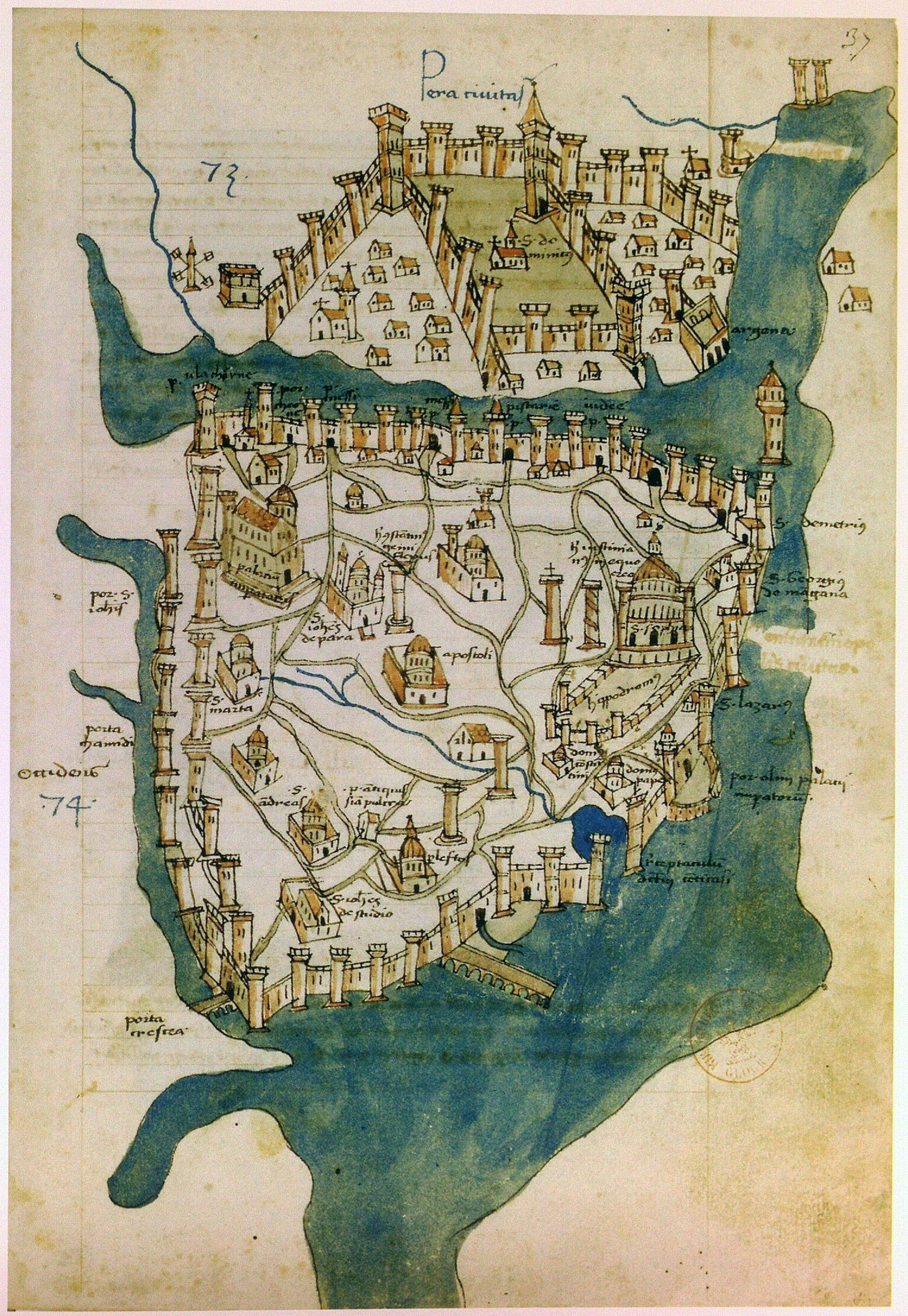
The map of Constantinople (1422) by Florentine cartographer Cristoforo Buondelmonti is the oldest surviving map of the city, and the only one that predates the Turkish conquest of it in 1453.

The Emperor Justinian I (527–565) was greatly respected for his successes in war, for his legal reforms and for his public works. It was from Constantinople that his expedition for the reconquest of the former Diocese of Africa set sail on or about 21 June 533. Before their departure, the ship of the commander Belisarius was anchored in front of the Imperial palace, and the Patriarch offered prayers for the success of the enterprise. After the victory, in 534, the Temple treasure of Jerusalem, looted by the Romans in AD 70 and taken to Carthage by the Vandals after their sack of Rome in 455, was brought to Constantinople and deposited for a time, perhaps in the Church of St Polyeuctus, before being returned to Jerusalem in either the Church of the Resurrection or the New Church.

Chariot racing had had significant importance in Rome for many centuries. In Constantinople, the hippodrome became, over time, increasingly a place of political significance. It was where (as a shadow of the popular elections of old Rome) the people by acclamation showed their approval of a new emperor, and also where they openly criticized the government, or clamored for the removal of unpopular ministers. It played a crucial role during the riots and in times of political unrest. The Hippodrome provided a space for a crowd to be responded to positively or where the acclamations of a crowd were subverted, resorting to the riots that would ensue in the coming years. In the time of Justinian's reign, public order in Constantinople became a critical political issue.

Throughout the late Roman and early Byzantine periods, Christianity was resolving fundamental questions of identity, and the dispute between the Chalcedonians and the non-Chalcedonians became the cause of serious disorder, expressed through allegiance to the chariot-racing parties of the Blues and the Greens. The partisans of the Blues and the Greens were said to affect untrimmed facial hair, head hair shaved at the front and grown long at the back, and wide-sleeved tunics tight at the wrist; and to form gangs to engage in night-time muggings and street violence. At last, these disorders took the form of a major rebellion of 532, known as the "Nika" riots (from the battle-cry of "Conquer!" of those involved). The Nika Riots began in the Hippodrome and finished there with the onslaught of over 30,000 people, according to Procopius, those in the blue and green factions, innocent and guilty. This came full circle in the relationship within the Hippodrome between the power and the people during the time of Justinian.

Emperor Justinian I commissioned the current Hagia Sophia after the previous one was destroyed in the Nika riots of 532. It was converted into a mosque in 1453 when the Ottoman Empire captured the city, while it served as a museum from 1935 to 2020, when it was converted back to a mosque.

Fires that were set in the city by the mobs involved in the Nika Riots consumed the Theodosian basilica of Hagia Sophia (Holy Wisdom), the city's cathedral, which lay to the north of the Augustaeum and had itself replaced the Constantinian basilica founded by Constantius II to replace the first Byzantine cathedral, Hagia Irene (Holy Peace). Justinian commissioned Anthemius of Tralles and Isidore of Miletus to replace it with a new and incomparable Hagia Sophia. This was the great cathedral of the city, whose dome was said to be held aloft by God alone, and which was directly connected to the palace so that the imperial family could attend services without passing through the streets. "The architectural form of the building was meant to reflect Justinian's programmatic harmony: the circular dome (a symbol of secular authority in classical Roman architecture) would be harmoniously combined with the rectangular form (typical for Christian and pre-Christian temples)." The dedication took place on 26 December 537 in the presence of the emperor, who was later reported to have exclaimed, "O Solomon, I have outdone thee!" Hagia Sophia was served by 600 people, including 80 priests, and cost 20,000 pounds of gold to build. It was an important cathedral of the Eastern Orthodox Church and served as the seat of the Ecumenical Patriarchate.

Justinian also had Anthemius and Isidore demolish and replace the original Church of the Holy Apostles and Hagia Irene, built by Constantine, with new churches under the same dedication. The Justinianic Church of the Holy Apostles was designed in the form of an equal-armed cross with five domes and ornamented with beautiful mosaics. This church was to remain the burial place of the emperors from Constantine himself until the 11th century. When the city fell to the Turks in 1453, the church was demolished to make room for the tomb of Sultan Mehmed II the Conqueror. Justinian was also concerned with other aspects of the city's built environment, legislating against the abuse of laws prohibiting building within 100 ft (30 m) of the sea front, in order to protect the view.

During Justinian I's reign, the city's population reached approximately 500,000 people, with some scholars suggesting it could have been higher. However, the social fabric of Constantinople was also damaged by the onset of the Plague of Justinian between 541 and 542 AD. It resulted in the death of up to 20% to 40% of the city's inhabitants, though revisionist historians suggest that the number of deaths was lower. Lasting two months, the plague is noted to have caused widespread civil disruption, including the inability of the population to bury the dead and attend relatives' funerals.

=== Survival, 565–717: Constantinople during the Byzantine Dark Ages ===
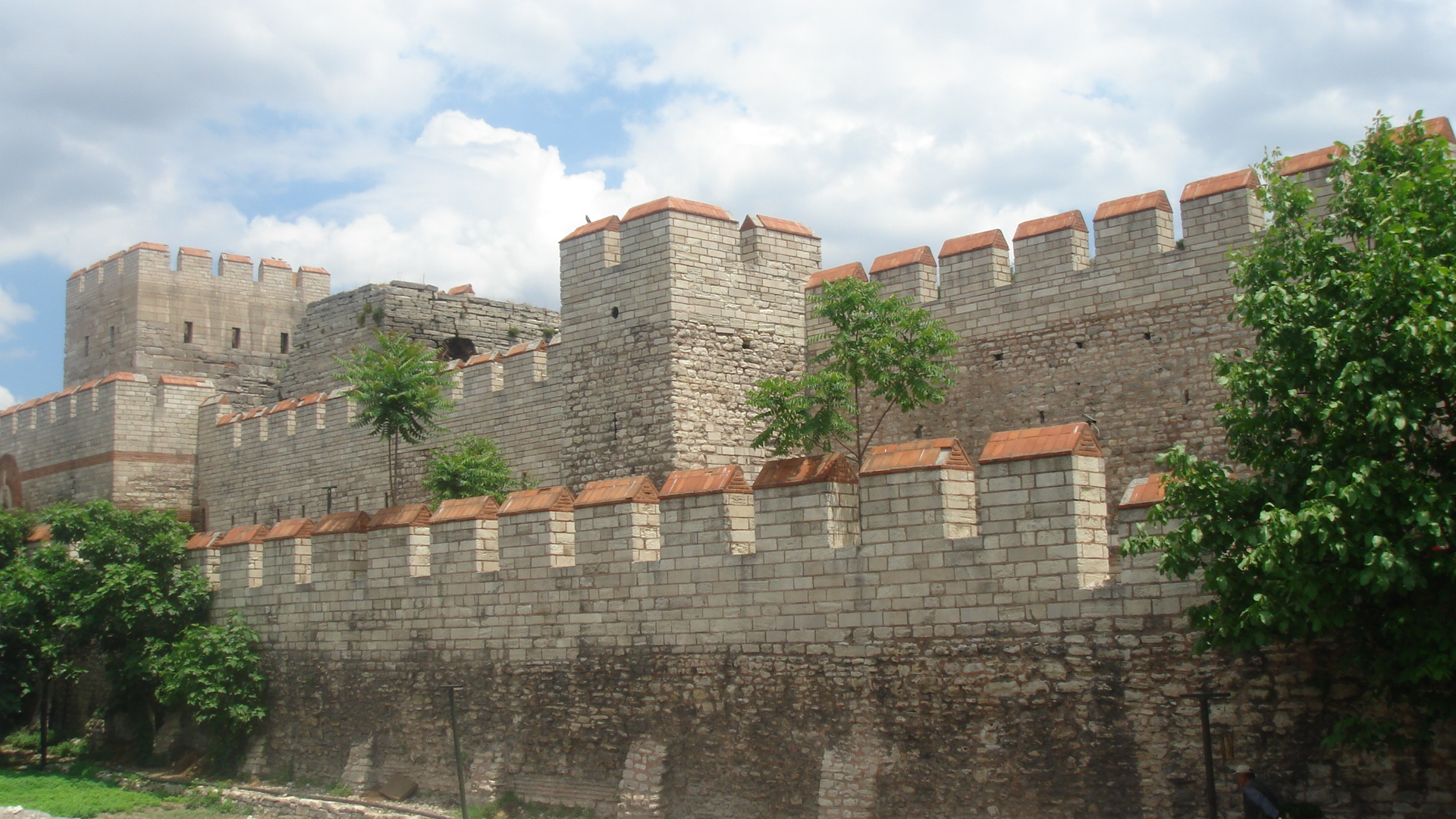
Restored section of the fortifications (Theodosian walls) that protected Constantinople during the medieval period

In the early 7th century, the Avars and later the Bulgars overwhelmed much of the Balkans, threatening Constantinople with attack from the west. Simultaneously, the Persian Sassanids overwhelmed the Prefecture of the East, penetrating deep into Anatolia. Heraclius, son of the exarch of Africa, set sail for the city and assumed the throne. He found the military situation so dire that he is said to have contemplated withdrawing the imperial capital to Carthage, but relented after the people of Constantinople begged him to stay. The citizens lost their right to free grain in 618 when Heraclius realized that the city could no longer be supplied from Egypt as a result of the Persian wars: the population fell substantially as a result.

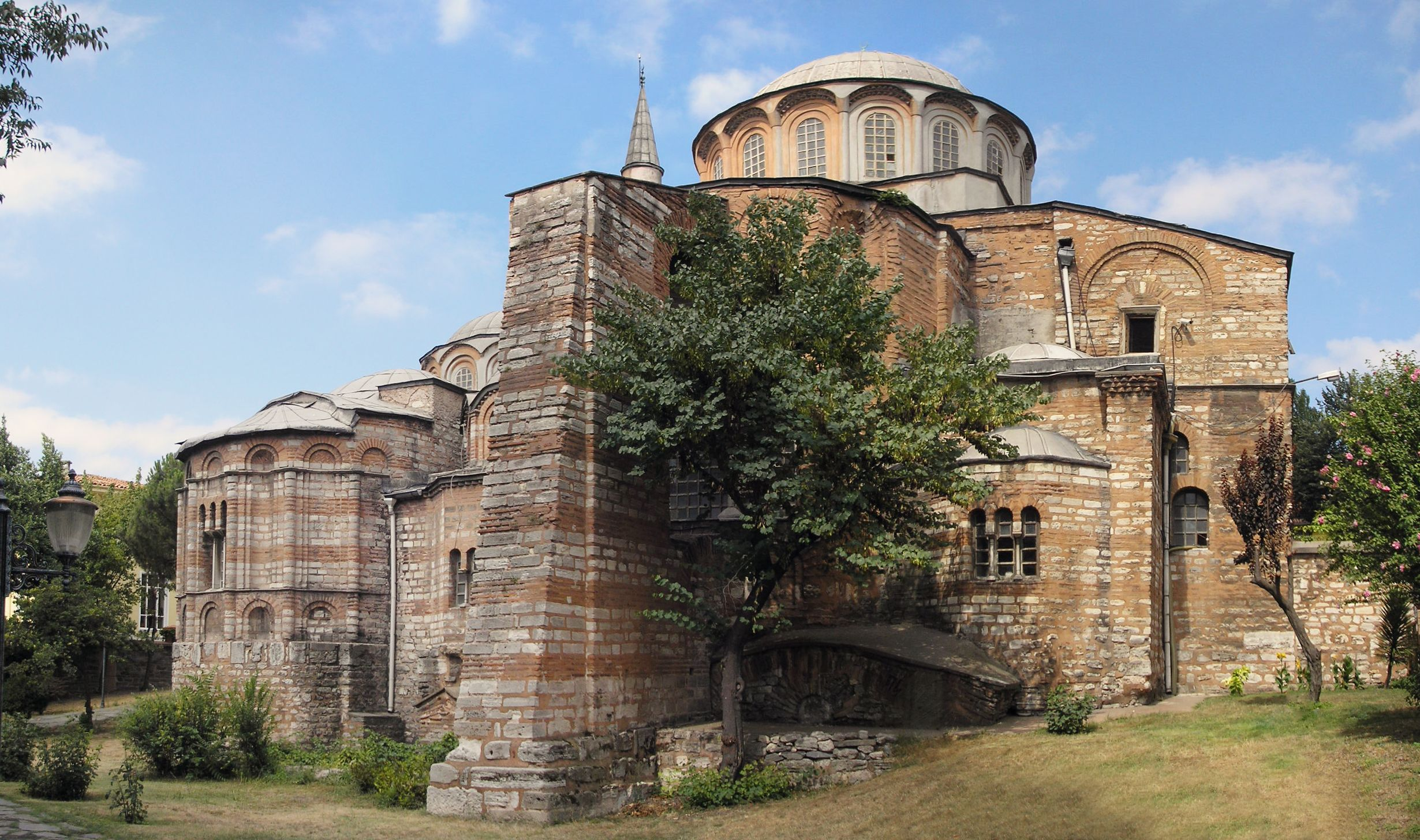
Chora Church, a medieval Byzantine Greek Orthodox church in Istanbul's Edirnekapı quarter, was converted into Kariye Mosque in 1500 and again in 2024, after serving as the Chora Museum from 1945 to 2020.

While the city withstood a siege by the Sassanids and Avars in 626, Heraclius campaigned deep into Persian territory. Eventually, he managed to briefly restore the status quo in 628, when the Persians surrendered all their conquests. However, the Byzantine Empire was soon threatened by a new adversary, as it became one of the primary targets of Arab invaders, who expanded their empire across the vast majority of the Middle East and North Africa, through a series of conquest campaigns, historically known as the Early Muslim conquests. Constantinople was besieged by the invading armies of the Arab Umayyad Caliphate firstly from 674 to 678, and secondly from 717 to 718. The Theodosian walls kept the city impenetrable from the land, while a newly discovered incendiary substance known as Greek fire allowed the Byzantine navy to destroy the Arab fleets and keep the city supplied. In the second siege, the second ruler of Bulgaria, Khan Tervel, rendered decisive help. He was called the Saviour of Europe.

=== 717–1025: Constantinople during the Macedonian Renaissance ===
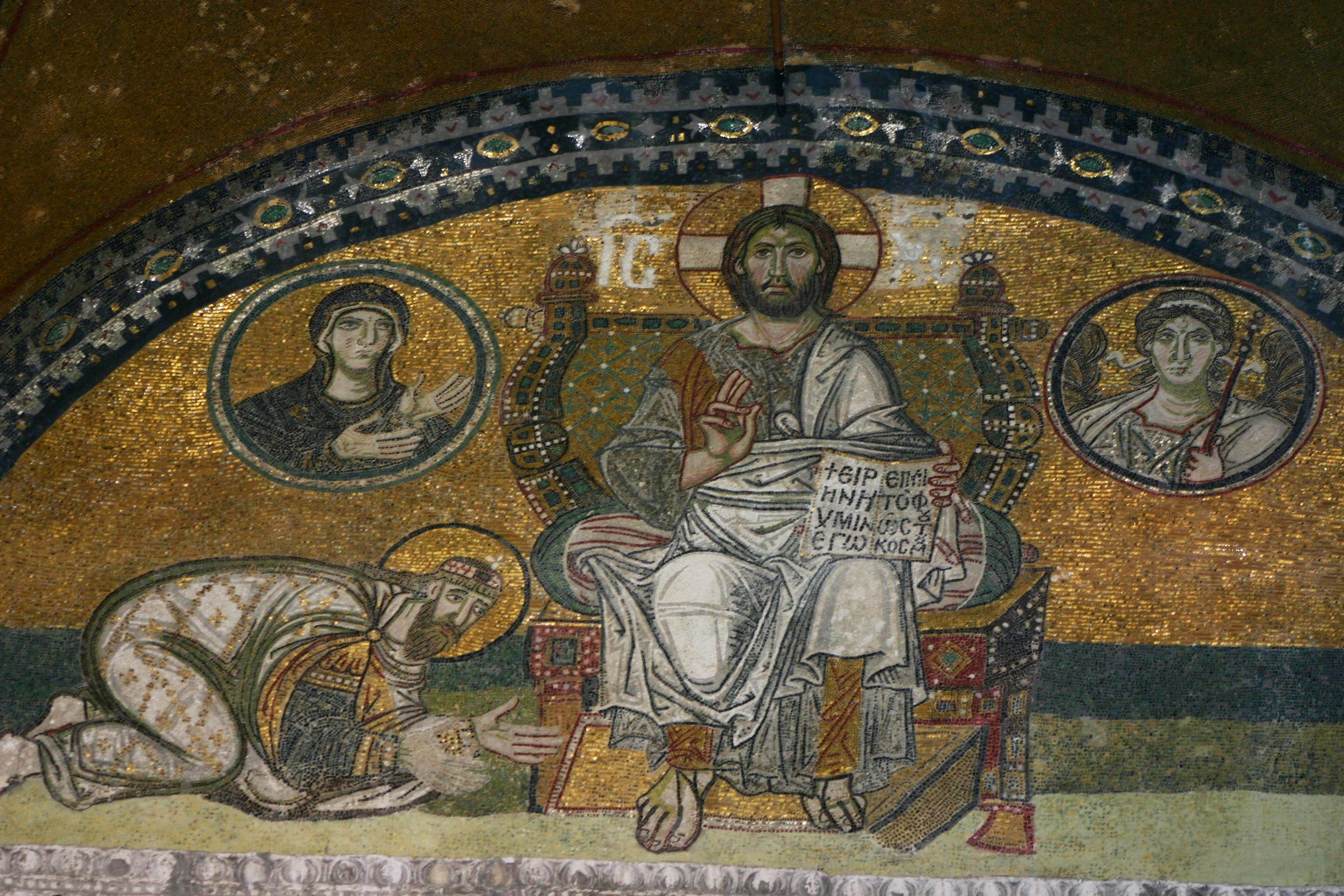
Emperor Leo VI (886–912) adoring Jesus Christ. Mosaic above the Imperial Gate in the Hagia Sophia.

In the 730s Leo III carried out extensive repairs of the Theodosian walls, which had been damaged by frequent and violent attacks; this work was financed by a special tax on all the subjects of the Empire.

Theodora, widow of the Emperor Theophilus (died 842), acted as regent during the minority of her son Michael III, who was said to have been introduced to dissolute habits by her brother Bardas. When Michael assumed power in 856, he became known for excessive drunkenness, appeared in the hippodrome as a charioteer and burlesqued the religious processions of the clergy. He removed Theodora from the Great Palace to the Carian Palace and later to the monastery of Gastria, but, after the death of Bardas, she was released to live in the palace of St Mamas; she also had a rural residence at the Anthemian Palace, where Michael was assassinated in 867.

In 860, an attack was made on the city by a new principality set up a few years earlier at Kiev by Askold and Dir, two Varangian chiefs: Two hundred small vessels passed through the Bosporus and plundered the monasteries and other properties on the suburban Princes' Islands. Oryphas, the admiral of the Byzantine fleet, alerted the emperor Michael, who promptly put the invaders to flight; but the suddenness and savagery of the onslaught made a deep impression on the citizens.

In 980, the emperor Basil II received an unusual gift from Prince Vladimir of Kiev: 6,000 Varangian warriors, which Basil formed into a new bodyguard known as the Varangian Guard. They were known for their ferocity, honour, and loyalty. However, following the death of an Emperor, they became known also for plunder in the Imperial palaces. Later in the 11th century the Varangian Guard became dominated by Anglo-Saxons who preferred this way of life to subjugation by the new Norman kings of England.

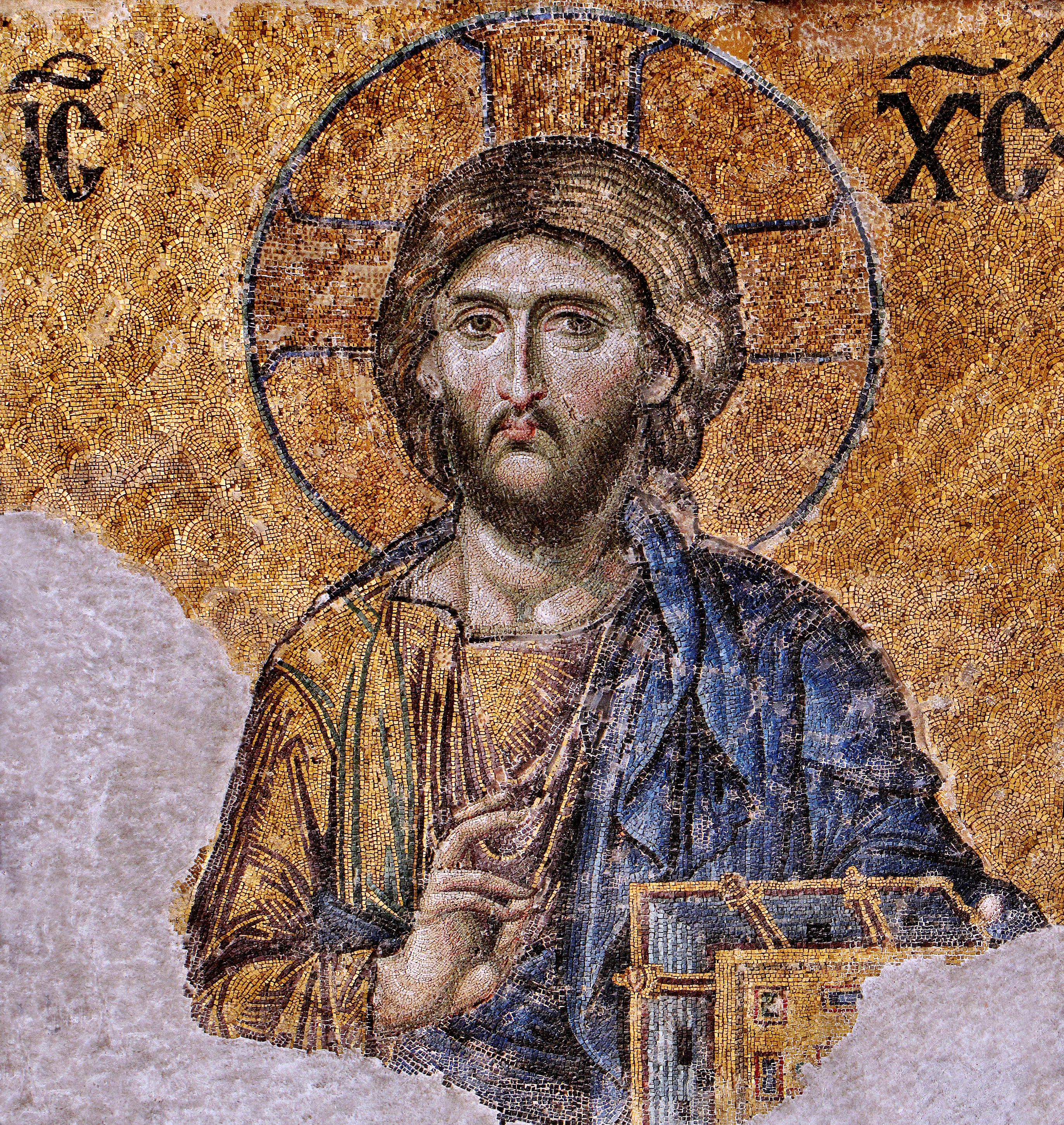
One of the most famous of the surviving Byzantine mosaics of the Hagia Sophia in Constantinople – the image of Christ Pantocrator on the walls of the upper southern gallery, Christ being flanked by the Virgin Mary and John the Baptist, c. 1261

The Book of the Eparch, which dates to the 10th century, gives a detailed picture of the city's commercial life and its organization at that time. The corporations in which the tradesmen of Constantinople were organised were supervised by the Eparch, who regulated such matters as production, prices, import, and export. Each guild had its own monopoly, and tradesmen might not belong to more than one. It is an impressive testament to the strength of tradition how little these arrangements had changed since the office, then known by the Latin version of its title, had been set up in 330 to mirror the urban prefecture of Rome.

In the 9th and 10th centuries, Constantinople had a population of between 500,000 and 800,000.

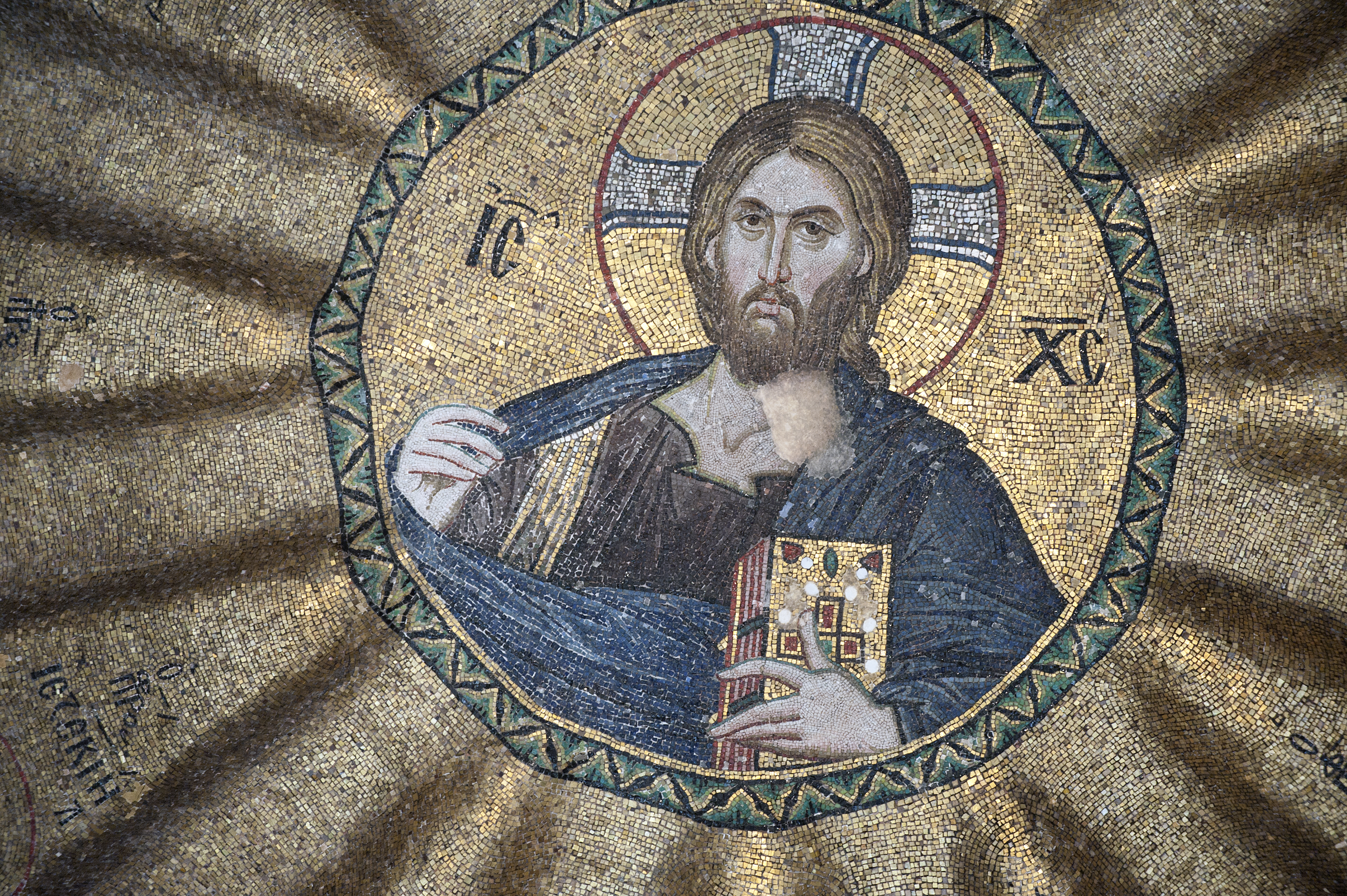
Mosaic of Jesus in Pammakaristos Church, Istanbul

==== Iconoclast controversy in Constantinople ====
In the 8th and 9th centuries, the iconoclast movement caused serious political unrest throughout the Empire. The emperor Leo III issued a decree in 726 against images, and ordered the destruction of a statue of Christ over one of the doors of the Chalke, an act that was fiercely resisted by the citizens. Constantine V convoked a church council in 754, which condemned the worship of images, after which many treasures were broken, burned, or painted over with depictions of trees, birds or animals: One source refers to the church of the Holy Virgin at Blachernae as having been transformed into a "fruit store and aviary". Following the death of her husband Leo IV in 780, the empress Irene restored the veneration of images through the agency of the Second Council of Nicaea in 787.

The iconoclast controversy returned in the early 9th century, only to be resolved once more in 843 during the regency of Empress Theodora, who restored the icons. These controversies contributed to the deterioration of relations between the Western and the Eastern Churches.

=== 1025–1081: Constantinople after Basil II ===
In the late 11th century catastrophe struck with the unexpected and calamitous defeat of the imperial armies at the Battle of Manzikert in Armenia in 1071. The Emperor Romanus Diogenes was captured. The peace terms demanded by Alp Arslan, sultan of the Seljuk Turks, were not excessive, and Romanus accepted them. On his release, however, Romanus found that enemies had placed their own candidate on the throne in his absence; he surrendered to them and suffered death by torture, and the new ruler, Michael VII Ducas, refused to honour the treaty. In response, the Turks began to move into Anatolia in 1073. The collapse of the old defensive system meant that they met no opposition, and the empire's resources were distracted and squandered in a series of civil wars. Thousands of Turkoman tribesmen crossed the unguarded frontier and moved into Anatolia. By 1080, a huge area had been lost to the Empire, and the Turks were within striking distance of Constantinople.

=== 1081–1185: Constantinople under the Komneni ===
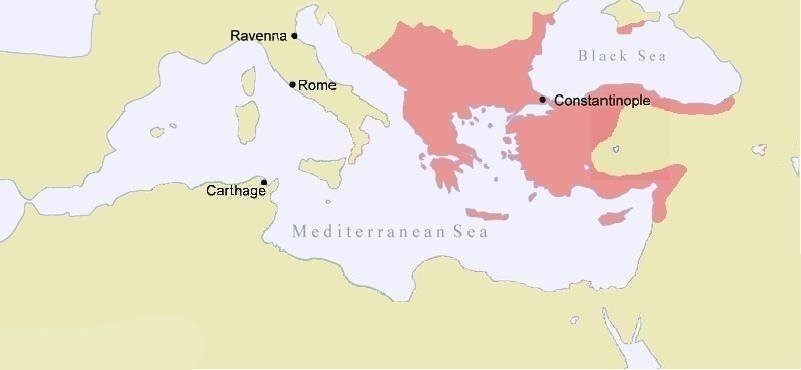
The Byzantine Empire under Manuel I, c. 1180

Under the Komnenian dynasty (1081–1185), Byzantium staged a remarkable recovery. In 1090–91, the nomadic Pechenegs reached the walls of Constantinople, where Emperor Alexius I with the aid of the Kipchaks annihilated their army. In response to a call for aid from Alexius, the First Crusade assembled at Constantinople in 1096, but declining to put itself under Byzantine command set out for Jerusalem on its own account. John II built the monastery of the Pantocrator (Almighty) with a hospital for the poor of 50 beds.

With the restoration of firm central government, the empire became fabulously wealthy. The population was rising (estimates for Constantinople in the 12th century vary from some 100,000 to 500,000), and towns and cities across the realm flourished. Meanwhile, the volume of money in circulation dramatically increased. This was reflected in Constantinople by the construction of the Blachernae palace, the creation of brilliant new works of art, and general prosperity at this time: an increase in trade, made possible by the growth of the Italian city-states, may have helped the growth of the economy. It is certain that the Venetians and others were active traders in Constantinople, making a living out of shipping goods between the Crusader Kingdoms of Outremer and the West, while also trading extensively with Byzantium and Egypt. The Venetians had factories on the north side of the Golden Horn, and large numbers of westerners were present in the city throughout the 12th century. Toward the end of Manuel I Komnenos's reign, the number of foreigners in the city reached about 60,000–80,000 people out of a total population of about 400,000 people. In 1171, Constantinople also contained a small community of 2,500 Jews. In 1182, most Latin (Western European) inhabitants of Constantinople were massacred.

In artistic terms, the 12th century was a very productive period. There was a revival in the mosaic art, for example: Mosaics became more realistic and vivid, with an increased emphasis on depicting three-dimensional forms. There was an increased demand for art, with more people having access to the necessary wealth to commission and pay for such work.

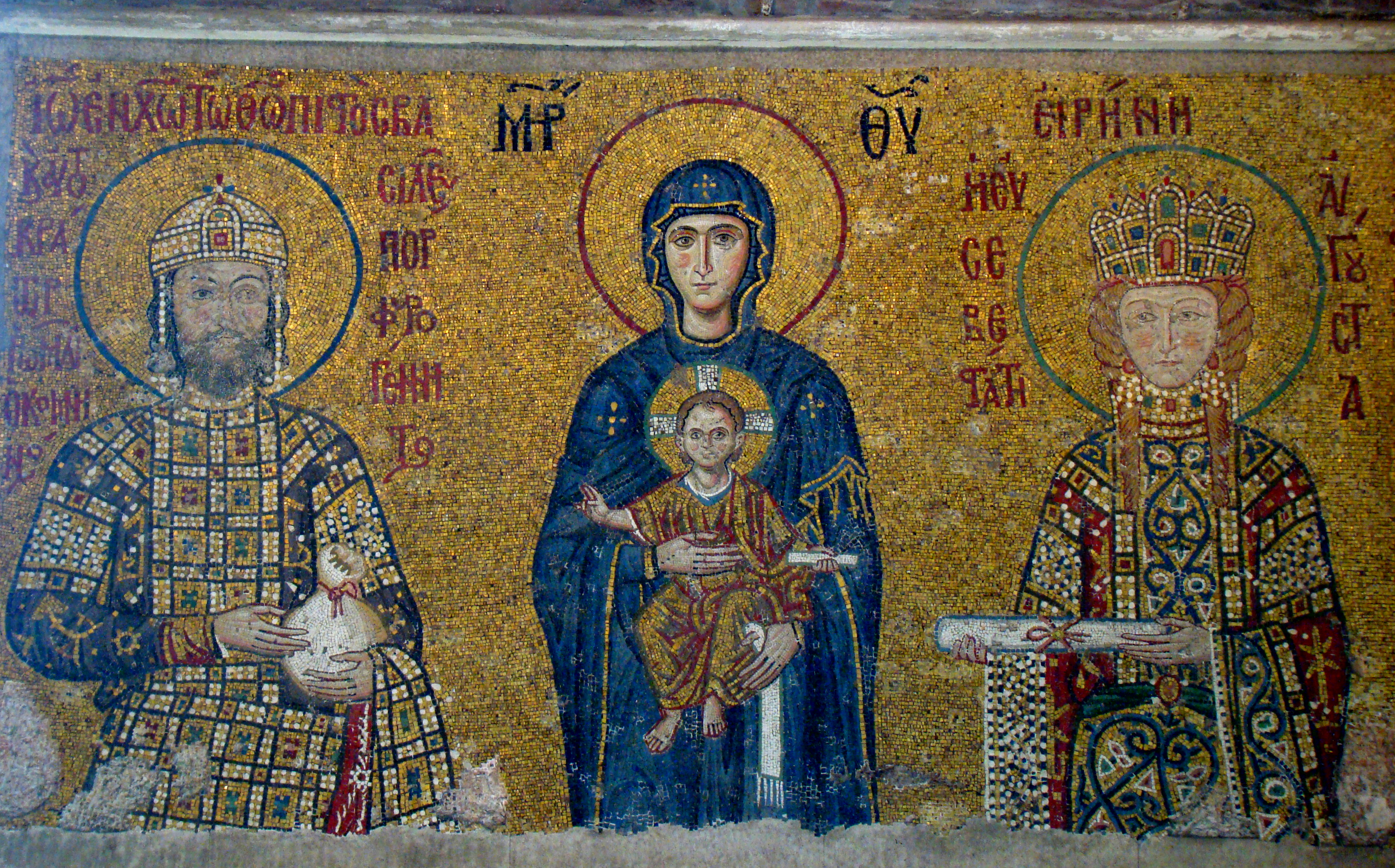
12th-century mosaic from the upper gallery of the Hagia Sophia, Constantinople. Emperor John II (1118–1143) is shown on the left, with the Virgin Mary and infant Jesus in the centre, and John's consort Empress Irene on the right.

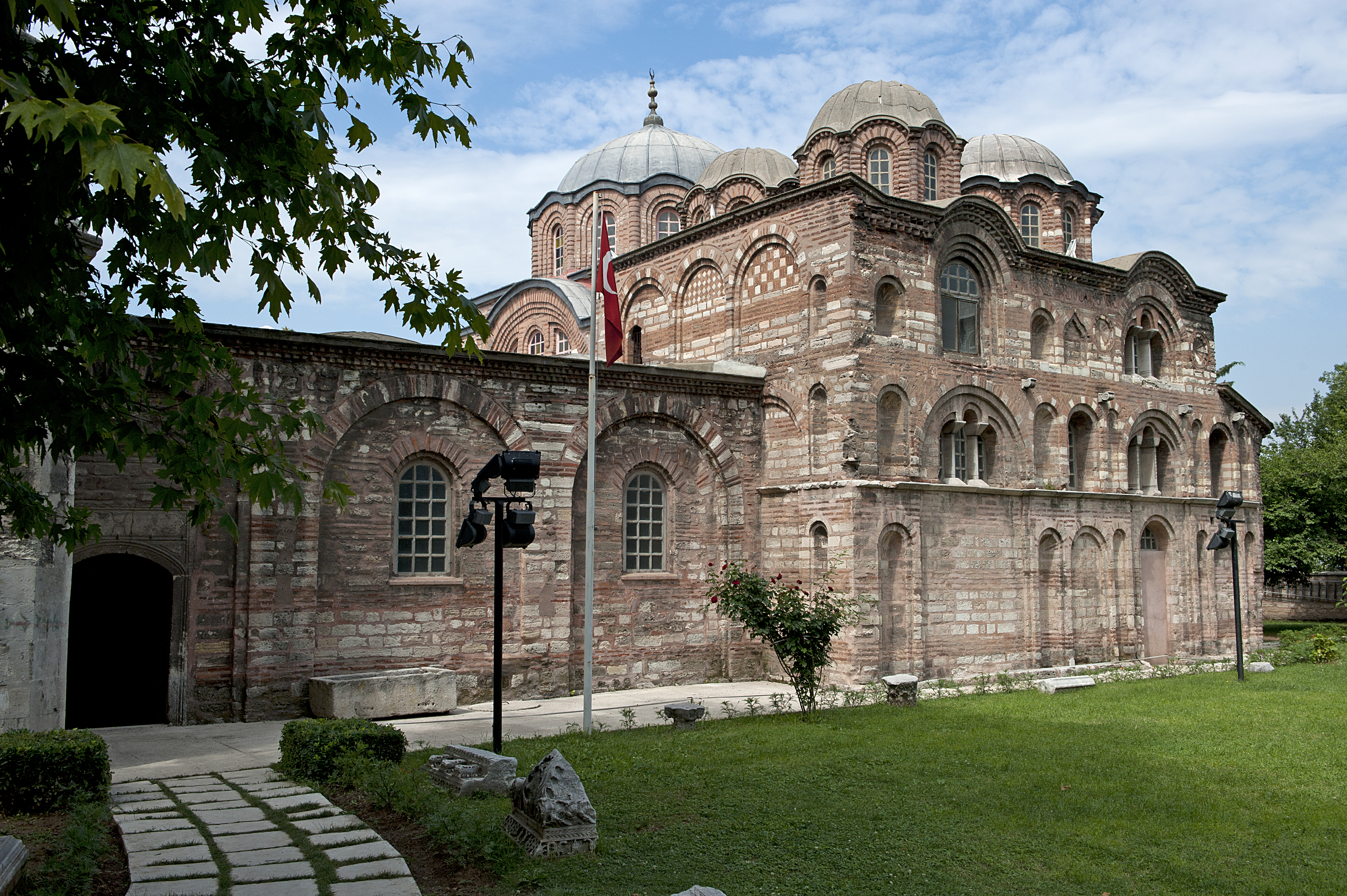
Pammakaristos Church, also known as the Church of Theotokos Pammakaristos (Greek: Θεοτόκος ἡ Παμμακάριστος, "All-Blessed Mother of God"), is one of the most famous Greek Orthodox Byzantine churches in Istanbul.

=== 1185–1261: Constantinople during the Imperial Exile ===
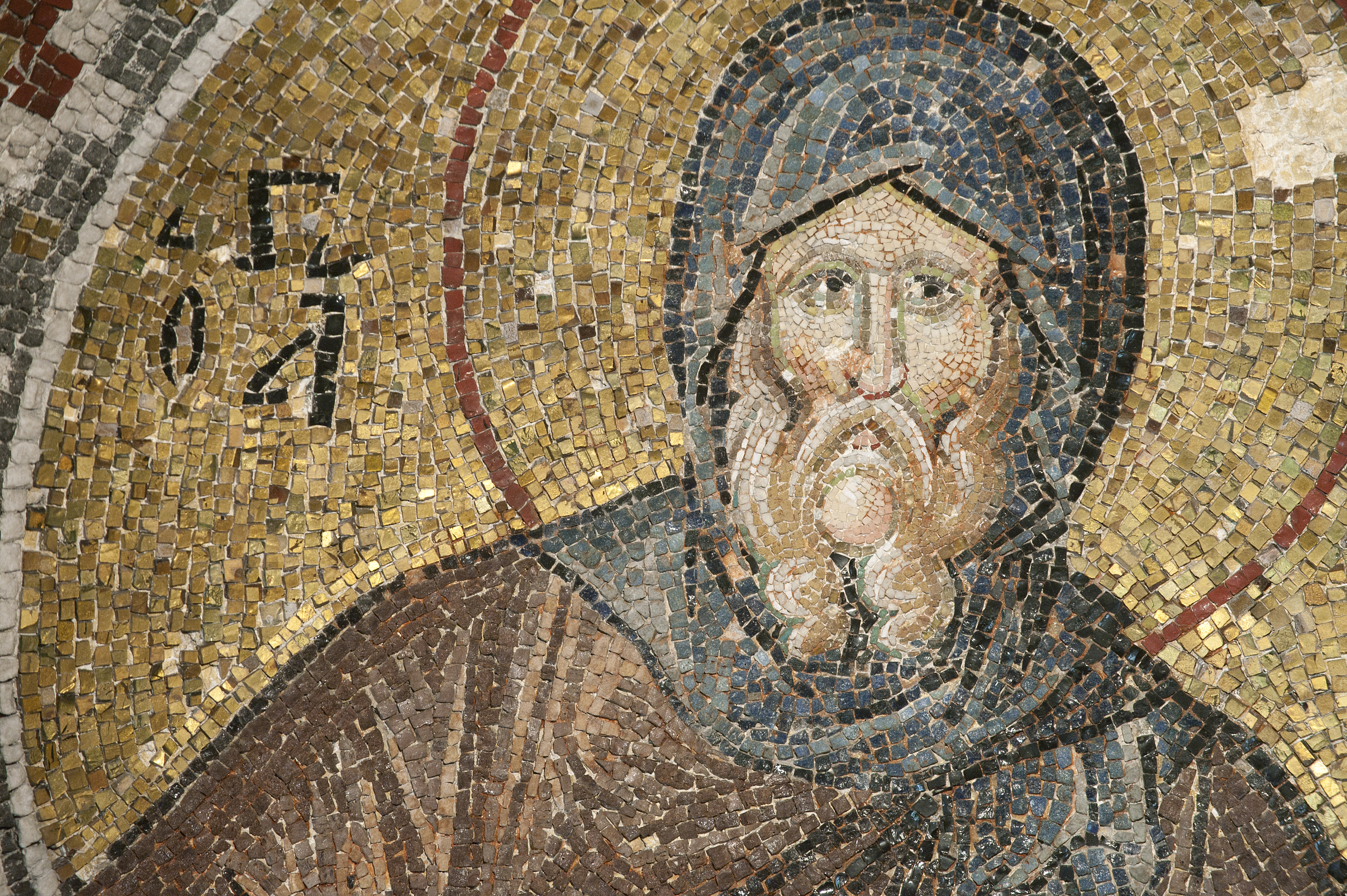
Pammakaristos Church mosaic of Saint Anthony, the desert Father

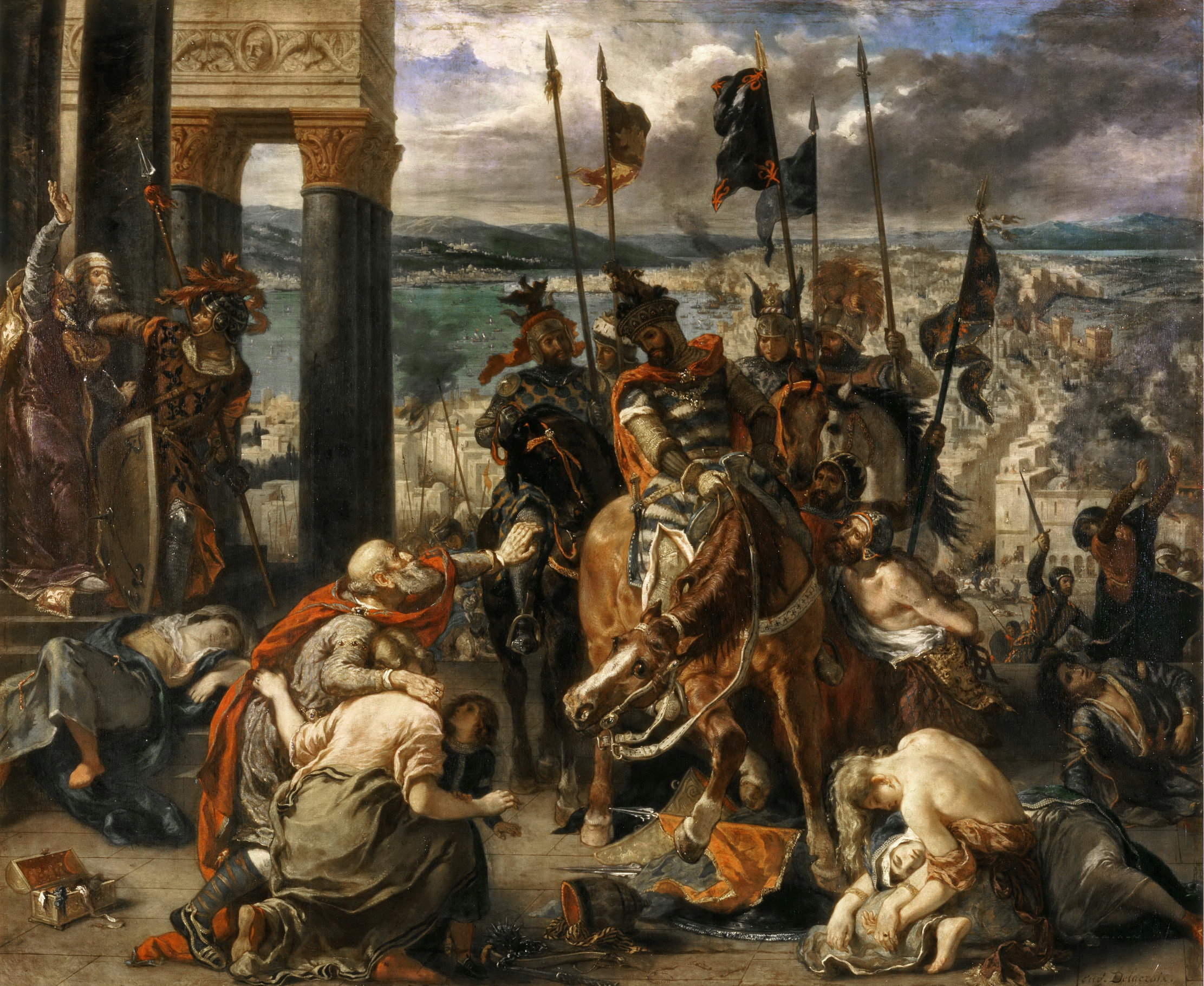
The Entry of the Crusaders into Constantinople, by Eugène Delacroix, 1840

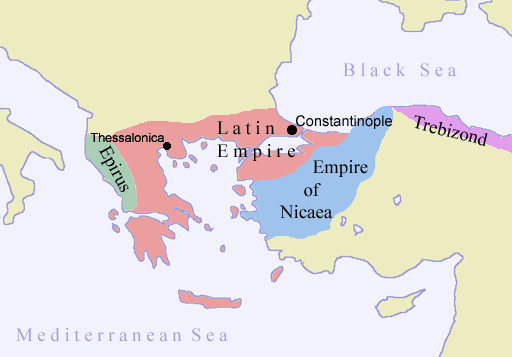
The Latin Empire, Empire of Nicaea, Empire of Trebizond, and the Despotate of Epirus. The borders are very uncertain.

On 25 July 1197, Constantinople was struck by a severe fire which burned the Latin Quarter and the area around the Gate of the Droungarios (Turkish: Odun Kapısı) on the Golden Horn. Nevertheless, the destruction wrought by the 1197 fire paled in comparison with that brought by the Crusaders. In the course of a plot between Philip of Swabia, Boniface of Montferrat and the Doge of Venice, the Fourth Crusade was, despite papal excommunication, diverted in 1203 against Constantinople, ostensibly promoting the claims of Alexios IV Angelos brother-in-law of Philip, son of the deposed emperor Isaac II Angelos. The reigning emperor Alexios III Angelos had made no preparation. The Crusaders occupied Galata, broke the defensive chain protecting the Golden Horn, and entered the harbour, where on 27 July they breached the sea walls: Alexios III fled. But the new Alexios IV Angelos found the Treasury inadequate, and was unable to make good the rewards he had promised to his western allies. Tension between the citizens and the Latin soldiers increased. In January 1204, the protovestiarius Alexios Murzuphlos provoked a riot, it is presumed, to intimidate Alexios IV, but whose only result was the destruction of the great statue of Athena Promachos, the work of Phidias, which stood in the principal forum facing west.

In February 1204, the people rose again: Alexios IV was imprisoned and executed, and Murzuphlos took the purple as Alexios V Doukas. He made some attempt to repair the walls and organise the citizenry, but there had been no opportunity to bring in troops from the provinces and the guards were demoralised by the revolution. An attack by the Crusaders on 6 April failed, but a second from the Golden Horn on 12 April succeeded, and the invaders poured in. Alexios V fled. The Senate met in Hagia Sophia and offered the crown to Theodore Lascaris, who had married into the Angelos dynasty, but it was too late. He came out with the Patriarch to the Golden Milestone before the Great Palace and addressed the Varangian Guard. Then the two of them slipped away with many of the nobility and embarked for Asia. By the next day the Doge and the leading Franks were installed in the Great Palace, and the city was given over to pillage for three days.

Sir Steven Runciman, historian of the Crusades, wrote that the sack of Constantinople is "unparalleled in history".

For nine centuries, [...] the great city had been the capital of Christian civilization. It was filled with works of art that had survived from ancient Greece and with the masterpieces of its own exquisite craftsmen. The Venetians [...] seized treasures and carried them off to adorn [...] their town. But the Frenchmen and Flemings were filled with a lust for destruction. They rushed in a howling mob down the streets and through the houses, snatching up everything that glittered and destroying whatever they could not carry, pausing only to murder or to rape, or to break open the wine-cellars [...] . Neither monasteries nor churches nor libraries were spared. In Hagia Sophia itself, drunken soldiers could be seen tearing down the silken hangings and pulling the great silver iconostasis to pieces, while sacred books and icons were trampled under foot. While they drank merrily from the altar-vessels a prostitute set herself on the Patriarch's throne and began to sing a ribald French song. Nuns were ravished in their convents. Palaces and hovels alike were entered and wrecked. Wounded women and children lay dying in the streets. For three days the ghastly scenes [...] continued, till the huge and beautiful city was a shambles. [...] When [...] order was restored, [...] citizens were tortured to make them reveal the goods that they had contrived to hide.

For the next half-century, Constantinople was the seat of the Latin Empire. Under the rulers of the Latin Empire, the city declined, both in population and the condition of its buildings. Alice-Mary Talbot cites an estimated population for Constantinople of 400,000 inhabitants; after the destruction wrought by the Crusaders on the city, about one third were homeless, and numerous courtiers, nobility, and higher clergy, followed various leading personages into exile. "As a result Constantinople became seriously depopulated," Talbot concludes.

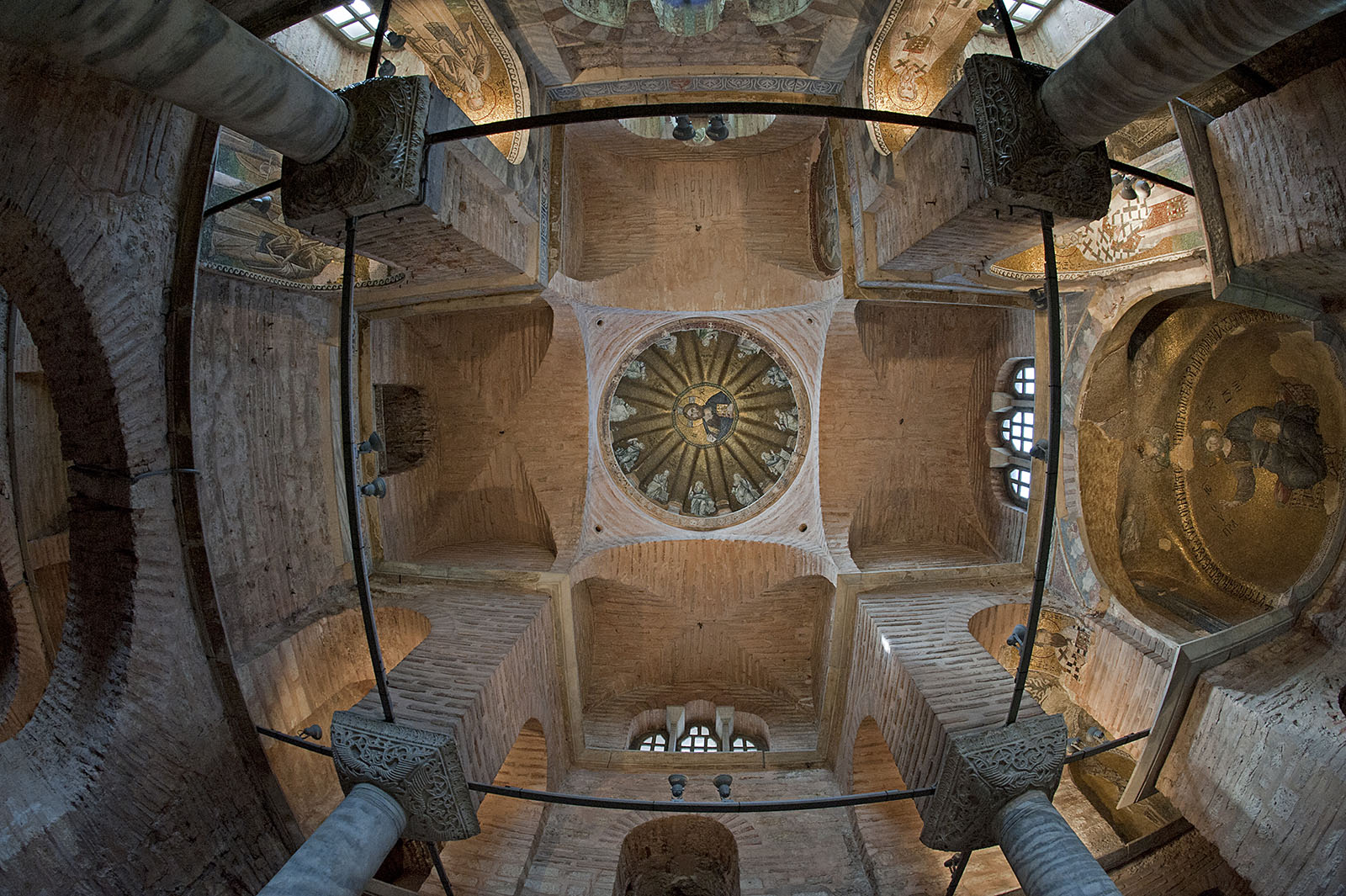
Dome of the Pammakaristos Church, Istanbul

The Latins took over at least 20 churches and 13 monasteries, most prominently the Hagia Sophia, which became the cathedral of the Latin Patriarch of Constantinople. It is to these that E.H. Swift attributed the construction of a series of flying buttresses to shore up the walls of the church, which had been weakened over the centuries by earthquake tremors. However, this act of maintenance is an exception: for the most part, the Latin occupiers were too few to maintain all of the buildings, either secular and sacred, and many became targets for vandalism or dismantling. Bronze and lead were removed from the roofs of abandoned buildings and melted down and sold to provide money to the chronically under-funded Empire for defense and to support the court; Deno John Geanokoplos writes that "it may well be that a division is suggested here: Latin laymen stripped secular buildings, ecclesiastics, the churches." Buildings were not the only targets of officials looking to raise funds for the impoverished Latin Empire: the monumental sculptures which adorned the Hippodrome and fora of the city were pulled down and melted for coinage. "Among the masterpieces destroyed, writes Talbot, "were a Herakles attributed to the fourth-century B.C. sculptor Lysippos, and monumental figures of Hera, Paris, and Helen."

The Nicaean emperor John III Vatatzes reportedly saved several churches from being dismantled for their valuable building materials; by sending money to the Latins "to buy them off" (exonesamenos), he prevented the destruction of several churches. According to Talbot, these included the churches of Blachernae, Rouphinianai, and St. Michael at Anaplous. He also granted funds for the restoration of the Church of the Holy Apostles, which had been seriously damaged in an earthquake.

The Byzantine nobility scattered, many going to Nicaea, where Theodore Lascaris set up an imperial court, or to Epirus, where Theodore Angelus did the same; others fled to Trebizond, where one of the Comneni had already with Georgian support established an independent seat of empire. Nicaea and Epirus both vied for the imperial title, and tried to recover Constantinople. In 1261, Constantinople was captured from its last Latin ruler, Baldwin II, by the forces of the Nicaean emperor Michael VIII Palaiologos under the command of Caesar Alexios Strategopoulos.

=== 1261–1453: Palaiologan Era and the Fall of Constantinople ===
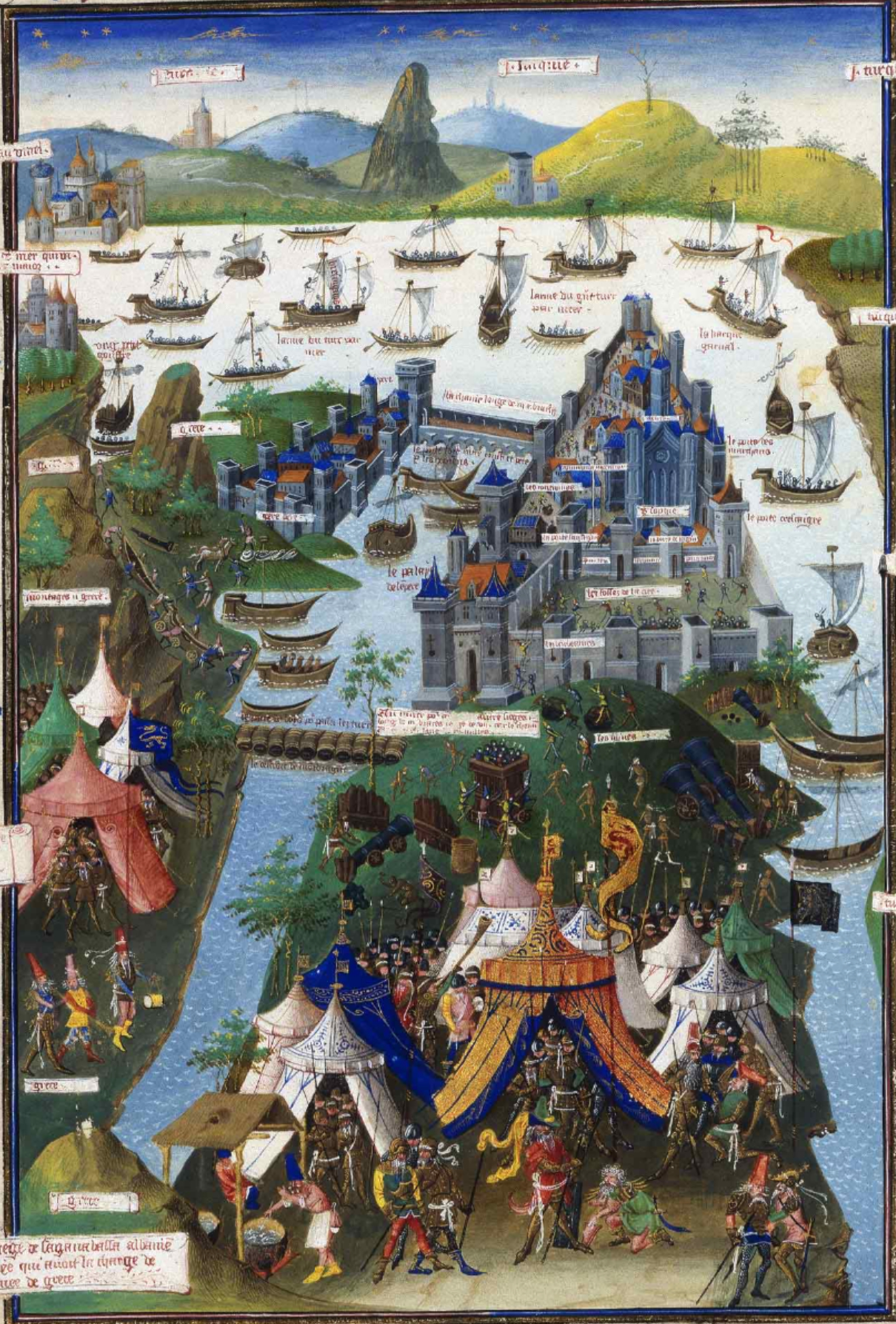
The final siege of Constantinople, contemporary 15th-century French miniature

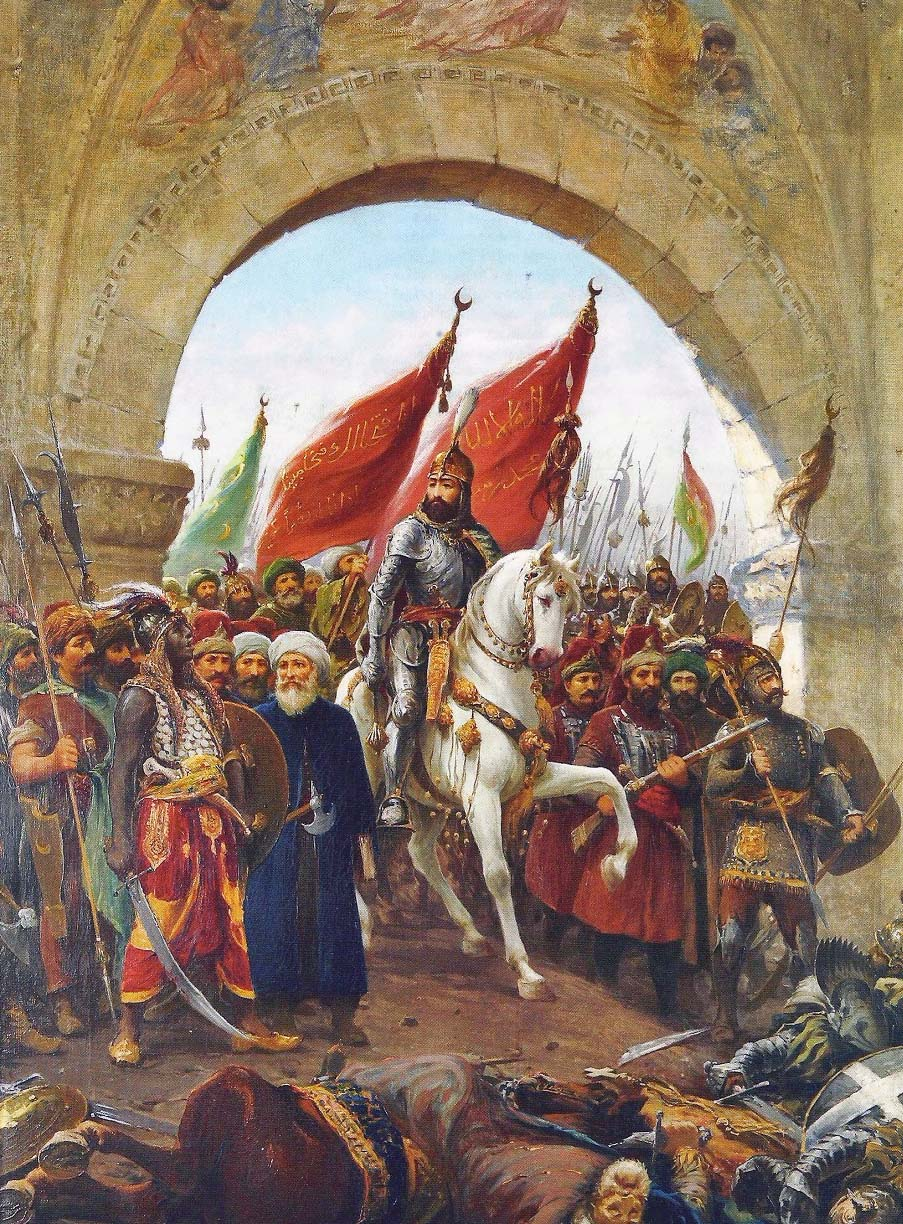
Mehmed the Conqueror enters Constantinople. Painting by Fausto Zonaro.

Although Constantinople was retaken by Michael VIII Palaiologos, the Empire had lost many of its key economic resources, and struggled to survive. The palace of Blachernae in the north-west of the city became the main Imperial residence, with the old Great Palace on the shores of the Bosporus going into decline. When Michael VIII captured the city, its population was 35,000 people, but, by the end of his reign, he had succeeded in increasing the population to about 70,000 people. The Emperor achieved this by summoning former residents who had fled the city when the crusaders captured it, and by relocating Greeks from the recently reconquered Peloponnese to the capital. Military defeats, civil wars, earthquakes and natural disasters were joined by the Black Death, which in 1347 spread to Constantinople, exacerbated the people's sense that they were doomed by God.

Castilian traveler and writer Ruy González de Clavijo, who saw Constantinople in 1403, wrote that the area within the city walls included small neighborhoods separated by orchards and fields. The ruins of palaces and churches could be seen everywhere. The aqueducts and the most densely inhabited neighborhoods were along the coast of the Marmara Sea and Golden Horn. Only the coastal areas, in particular the commercial areas facing the Golden Horn, had a dense population. Although the Genoese colony in Galata was small, it was overcrowded and had magnificent mansions.

By May 1453, the city no longer possessed the treasure troves of Aladdin that the Ottoman troops longingly imagined as they stared up at the walls. Gennadios Scholarios, Patriarch of Constantinople from 1454 to 1464, was saying that the capital of the Empire, that was once the "city of wisdom", became "the city of ruins".

When the Ottoman Turks captured the city (1453) it contained approximately 50,000 people. Tedaldi of Florence estimated the population at 30,000 to 36,000, while in Chronica Vicentina, the Italian Andrei di Arnaldo estimated it at 50,000. The plague epidemic of 1435 must have caused the population to drop.

The population decline also had a huge impact upon the Constantinople's defense capabilities. At the end of March 1453, emperor Constantine XI ordered a census of districts to record how many able-bodied men were in the city and whatever weapons each possessed for defense. George Sphrantzes, the faithful chancellor of the last emperor, recorded that "in spite of the great size of our city, our defenders amounted to 4,773 Greeks, as well as just 200 foreigners". In addition there were volunteers from outside, the "Genoese, Venetians and those who came secretly from Galata to help the defense", who numbered "hardly as many as three thousand", amounting to something under 8,000 men in total to defend a perimeter wall of twelve miles.

Constantinople was conquered by the Ottoman Empire on 29 May 1453. Mehmed II intended to complete his father's mission and conquer Constantinople for the Ottomans. In 1452 he reached peace treaties with Hungary and Venice. He also began the construction of the Boğazkesen (later called the Rumelihisarı), a fortress at the narrowest point of the Bosphorus Strait, in order to restrict passage between the Black and Mediterranean seas. Mehmed then tasked the Hungarian gunsmith Urban with both arming Rumelihisarı and building a cannon powerful enough to bring down the walls of Constantinople. By March 1453 Urban's cannon had been transported from the Ottoman capital of Edirne to the outskirts of Constantinople. In April, having quickly seized Byzantine coastal settlements along the Black Sea and Sea of Marmara, Ottoman troops in Rumelia and Anatolia assembled outside the Byzantine capital. Their fleet moved from Gallipoli to nearby Diplokionion, and the sultan himself set out to meet his army. The Ottomans were commanded by 21-year-old Ottoman Sultan Mehmed II. The conquest of Constantinople followed a seven-week siege which had begun on 6 April 1453. The Empire fell on 29 May 1453.

The number of people captured by the Ottomans after the fall of the city was around 33,000. The small number of people left in the city indicates that there could not have been many residents there. The primary concern of Mehmed II in the early years of his reign was the construction and settlement of the city. However, since an insufficient number of Muslims accepted his invitation, the settlement of 30 abandoned neighborhoods with the inhabitants of formerly conquered areas became necessary.

=== 1453–1930: Ottoman and Republican Kostantiniyye ===
The Christian Orthodox city of Constantinople was now under Ottoman control. As tradition followed for the region, Ottoman soldiers had three days to pillage the city. When Mehmed II on the second day entered Constantinople through the Gate of Charisius (today known as Edirnekapı or Adrianople Gate), it is said that first thing he did was ride his horse to Hagia Sophia, which was not in good shape even though it was avoided in the pillage by strict orders. Displeased by the pillaging, Mehmed II ordered it to end, for it will be the capital of his empire. He then ordered that an imam meet him in Hagia Sophia in order to chant the adhan thus transforming the Orthodox cathedral into a Muslim mosque, solidifying Islamic rule in Constantinople.

Mehmed's main concern with Constantinople had to do with consolidating control over the city and rebuilding its defenses. After 45,000 captives were marched from the city, building projects were commenced immediately after the conquest, which included the repair of the walls, construction of the citadel, and building a new palace. Mehmed issued orders across his empire that Muslims, Christians, and Jews should resettle the city, with Christians and Jews required to pay jizya and Muslims pay Zakat; he demanded that five thousand households needed to be transferred to Constantinople by September. From all over the Islamic empire, prisoners of war and deported people were sent to the city: these people were called "Sürgün" in Turkish (Greek: σουργούνιδες). Two centuries later, Ottoman traveler Evliya Çelebi gave a list of groups introduced into the city with their respective origins. Even today, many quarters of Istanbul, such as Aksaray, Çarşamba, bear the names of the places of origin of their inhabitants. However, many people escaped again from the city, and there were several outbreaks of plague, so that in 1459 Mehmed allowed the deported Greeks to come back to the city.

From the sixteenth century onward the city regained its pre-eminence in Ottoman and Mediterranean affairs. Imperial building campaigns under successive sultans, notably the great mosque complexes and charitable foundations of Suleyman the Magnificent, consolidated an urban landscape of palaces, mosques, bathhouses and markets that anchored Constantinople as the empire's symbolic capital and a hub of artisan production and long-distance trade. Later historians marked an urban growth in the sixteenth century as Constantinople attracted officials and merchants to its bazaars.

The Tanzimat reforms (1839-1876) and subsequent Ottoman modernization initiatives introduced new municipal institutions, secular legal codes, and European architectural fashions to the city. The imperial household itself signalled a stylistic shift when Sultan Abdülmecid I commissioned the European-style Dolmabahçe Palace (built 1843-1856) and shifted major ceremonial functions toward the Bosphorus waterfront. At the same time, the district of Pera/Beyoğlu and the Genoese quarter of Galata grew into a distinctively cosmopolitan zone of foreign embassies, banks, hotels and cafes, with a Turkish-Levantine urban culture.

The stresses of war and diplomatic crisis in the early twentieth century - culminating in the First World War, the empire's defeat, and the Allied occupation of the city after 1918 - brought dramatic political and demographic change. Allied forces entered Constantinople in November 1918 and maintained an occupation that formally lasted until 1923. The final collapse of the Ottoman constitutional order accelerated the city's transformation. The Turkish War of Independence (1919-1923) ended with the abolition of the sultanate in 1922 and the exile of Mehmed VI; the new Republic of Turkey was proclaimed in 1923 and the capital was moved to Ankara as part of a deliberate program to build a new, secular, and more centrally planned state. Constantinople, long known in Turkish speech as "Istanbul" or vernacularly as "Stamboul", remained the country's largest city and commercial hub. However, its political centrality was reduced as republican institutions, ministries and diplomatic missions were centered in Ankara.

== Culture ==
Constantinople was the largest and richest urban center in the Eastern Mediterranean Sea during the late Roman Empire, mostly as a result of its strategic position commanding the trade routes between the Aegean Sea and the Black Sea. It would remain the capital of the eastern, Greek-speaking empire for over a thousand years and in some ways is the nexus of Byzantine art production. At its peak, roughly corresponding to the Middle Ages, it was one of the richest and largest cities in Europe. It exerted a powerful cultural pull and dominated much of the economic life in the Mediterranean. Visitors and merchants were especially struck by the beautiful monasteries and churches of the city, in particular the Hagia Sophia, or the Church of Holy Wisdom. According to Russian 14th-century traveler Stephen of Novgorod: "There is much that amazes one there, which the human mind cannot express".

It was especially important for preserving in its libraries manuscripts of Greek and Latin authors throughout a period when instability and disorder caused their mass-destruction in western Europe and north Africa: On the city's fall, thousands of these were brought by refugees to Italy, and played a key part in stimulating the Renaissance, and the transition to the modern world. The cumulative influence of the city on the west, over the many centuries of its existence, is incalculable. In terms of technology, art and culture, as well as sheer size, Constantinople was without parallel anywhere in Europe for a thousand years. Many languages were spoken in Constantinople. A 16th century Chinese geographical treatise specifically recorded that there were translators living in the city, indicating it was multilingual, multicultural, and cosmopolitan.

=== Markets ===
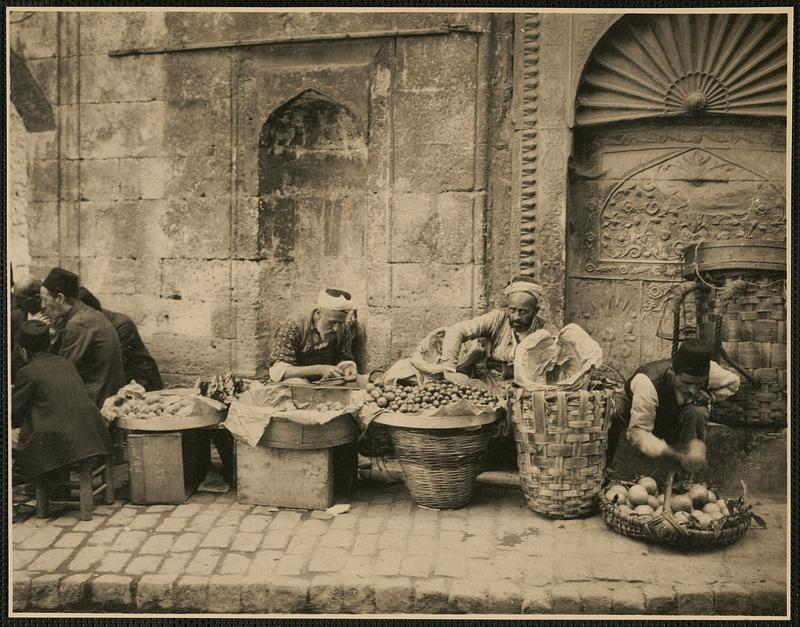
A characteristic group of street merchants of Constantinople, ca. 1870-1920; from the Nicholas Catsimpoolas Collection of the Boston Public Library

Even before Constantinople was founded, the markets of Byzantion were mentioned first by Xenophon and then by Theopompus who wrote that Byzantians "spent their time at the market and the harbour". In Justinian's age the Mese street running across the city from east to west was a daily market. Procopius claimed "more than 500 prostitutes" did business along the market street. Ibn Batutta who traveled to the city in 1325 wrote of the bazaars "Astanbul" in which the "majority of the artisans and salespeople in them are women".

=== Architecture and coinage ===
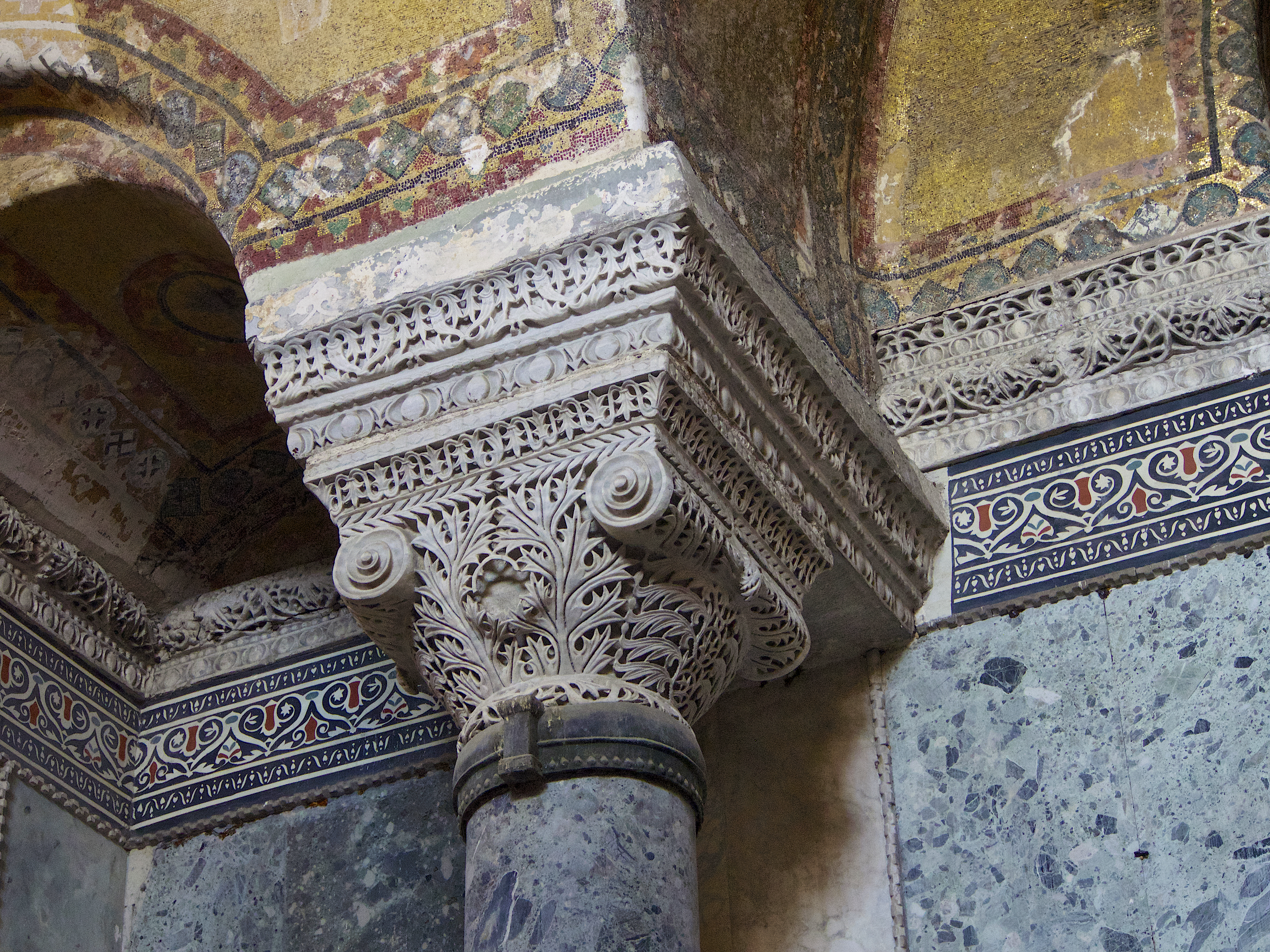
Columns of the Hagia Sophia, currently a mosque

The Byzantine Empire used Roman and Greek architectural models and styles to create its own unique type of architecture. The influence of Byzantine architecture and art can be seen in the copies taken from it throughout Europe. Particular examples include St Mark's Basilica in Venice, the basilicas of Ravenna, and many churches throughout the Slavic East. Also, alone in Europe until the 13th-century Italian florin, the Empire continued to produce sound gold coinage, the solidus of Diocletian becoming the bezant prized throughout the Middle Ages. Its city walls were much imitated (for example, see Caernarfon Castle) and its urban infrastructure was moreover a marvel throughout the Middle Ages, keeping alive the art, skill and technical expertise of the Roman Empire. In the Ottoman period Islamic architecture and symbolism were used. Great bathhouses were built in Byzantine centers such as Constantinople and Antioch.

=== Religion ===
Constantine's foundation gave prestige to the Bishop of Constantinople, who eventually came to be known as the Ecumenical Patriarch, and made it a prime center of Christianity alongside Rome. This contributed to cultural and theological differences between Eastern and Western Christianity eventually leading to the Great Schism that divided Western Catholicism from Eastern Orthodoxy from 1054 onwards. Constantinople is also of great religious importance to Islam, as the soon to be coming conquest of Constantinople is one of the signs of the end time in Islam.

=== Education ===
There were many institutions in ancient Constantinople such as the Imperial University of Constantinople, sometimes known as the University of the Palace Hall of Magnaura (Greek: Πανδιδακτήριον τῆς Μαγναύρας), a Byzantine educational institution that could trace its corporate origins to 425 AD, when the emperor Theodosius II founded the Pandidacterium (Medieval Greek: Πανδιδακτήριον).

== International status ==
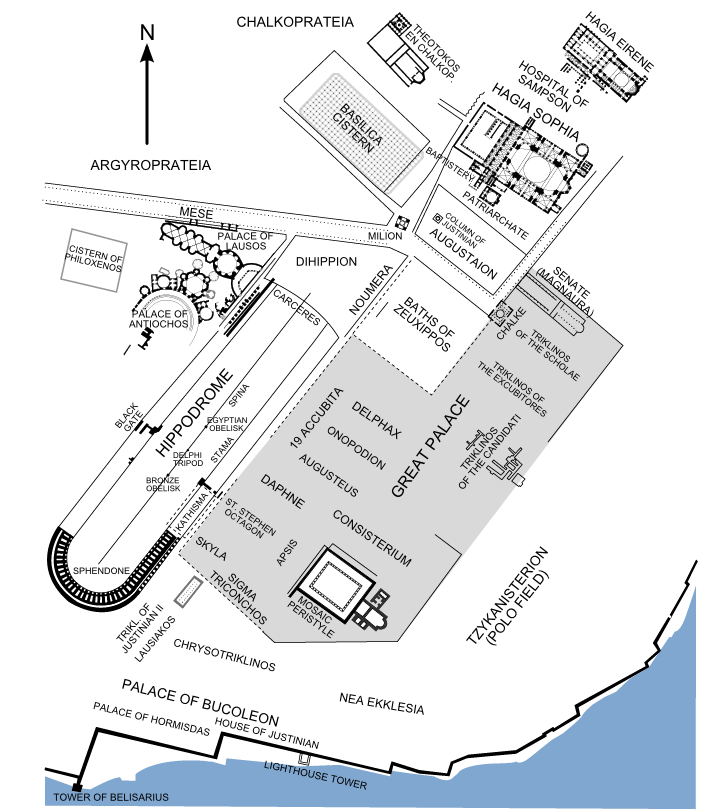
Constantinople's monumental center

The city acted as a defence for the eastern provinces of the old Roman Empire against the barbarian invasions of the 5th century. The 18-meter-tall (59 ft) walls built by Theodosius II were, in essence, impregnable to the barbarians coming from south of the Danube river, who found easier targets to the west rather than the richer provinces to the east in Asia. From the 5th century, the city was also protected by the Anastasian Wall, a 60-kilometer (37 mi) chain of walls across the Thracian peninsula. Many scholars argue that these sophisticated fortifications allowed the east to develop relatively unbothered while Ancient Rome and the west collapsed.

Constantinople's fame was such that it was described even in contemporary Chinese histories, the Old and New Book of Tang, which mentioned its massive walls and gates as well as a purported clepsydra mounted with a golden statue of a man. The Chinese histories even related how the city had been besieged in the 7th century by Mu'awiya I and how he exacted tribute in a peace settlement.

== See also ==
=== People from Constantinople ===
- List of people from Constantinople

=== Secular buildings and monuments ===
- Augustaion
  - Column of Justinian
- Basilica Cistern
- Column of Marcian
- Bucoleon Palace
- Horses of Saint Mark
- Obelisk of Theodosius
- Serpent Column
- Walled Obelisk
- Palace of Lausus
- Cistern of Philoxenos
- Palace of the Porphyrogenitus
- Prison of Anemas
- Valens Aqueduct

=== Churches, monasteries and mosques ===
- Church of Saint Thekla of the Palace of Blachernae
- Church of Myrelaion
- Chora Church
- Church of Saints Sergius and Bacchus
- Church of the Holy Apostles
- Church of St. Polyeuctus
- Monastery of Christ Pantepoptes
- Lips Monastery
- Monastery of the Christ the Benefactor
- Hagia Irene
- Saint John the Forerunner by-the-Dome
- Church of Theotokos Kyriotissa
- Church of Saint Andrew in Krisei
- Nea Ekklesia
- Pammakaristos Church
- Stoudios Monastery
- Toklu Dede Mosque
- Church of Saint Theodore
- Monastery of the Pantokrator
- Unnamed mosque established during Byzantine times for visiting Muslim dignitaries

=== Miscellaneous ===
- Ahmed Bican Yazıcıoğlu
- Byzantine calendar
- Byzantine silk
- Eparch of Constantinople (List of eparchs)
- Sieges of Constantinople
- Third Rome
- Thracia
- Timeline of Istanbul history

== Bibliography ==
- Ball, Warwick (2016). Rome in the East: Transformation of an Empire, 2nd edition. London & New York: Routledge. ISBN 978-0-415-72078-6.
- Bogdanović, Jelena (2016). "The Relational Spiritual Geopolitics of Constantinople, the Capital of the Byzantine Empire". Political Landscapes of Capital Cities. Boulder : University Press of Colorado: 97–153. doi:10.5876/9781607324690.c003. ISBN 9781607324690. Archived from the original on 9 January 2022.
- Bury, J. B. (1958). History of the Later Roman Empire: From the Death of Theodosius I to the Death of Justinian. Dover Publications.
- Crowley, Roger (2005). Constantinople: Their Last Great Siege, 1453. Faber and Faber. ISBN 978-0-571-22185-1.
- Emerson, Charles. 1913: In Search of the World Before the Great War (2013) compares Constantinople to 20 major world cities; pp 358–80.
- Evans, Helen C.; Wixom, William D (1997). The glory of Byzantium: art and culture of the Middle Byzantine era, A.D. 843–1261. New York: The Metropolitan Museum of Art. ISBN 978-0-8109-6507-2.
- Frazee, Charles A. (1978). "The Catholic Church in Constantinople, 1204–1453". Balkan Studies. 19: 33–49. ISSN 2241-1674. Archived from the original on 18 October 2019.
- Freely, John (1998). Istanbul: The Imperial City. Penguin. ISBN 978-0-14-024461-8.
- Freely, John; Ahmet S. Cakmak (2004). The Byzantine Monuments of Istanbul. Cambridge University Press. ISBN 978-0-521-77257-0.
- Gibbon, Edward (2005). The Decline and Fall of the Roman Empire. Phoenix Press. ISBN 978-0-7538-1881-7.
- Hanna-Riitta, Toivanen (2007). The Influence of Constantinople on Middle Byzantine Architecture (843–1204). A typological and morphological approach at the provincial level. Suomen kirkkohistoriallisen seuran toimituksia 202 (Publications of the Finnish Society of Church History No. 202). ISBN 978-952-5031-41-6.
- Harris, Jonathan (9 February 2017). Constantinople: Capital of Byzantium. Bloomsbury, 2nd edition, 2017. ISBN 978-1-4742-5465-6. online review Archived 2021-05-30 at the Wayback Machine
- Harris, Jonathan (20 November 2014). Byzantium and the Crusades. Bloomsbury, 2nd edition, 2014. ISBN 978-1-78093-767-0.
- Herrin, Judith (2008). Byzantium: The Surprising Life of a Medieval Empire. Princeton University Press. ISBN 978-0-691-13151-1.
- Hirth, Friedrich (2000) [1885]. Jerome S. Arkenberg (ed.). "East Asian History Sourcebook: Chinese Accounts of Rome, Byzantium and the Middle East, c. 91 B.C.E. – 1643 C.E." Fordham.edu. Fordham University. Archived from the original on 13 April 2020.
- Ibrahim, Raymond (2018). Sword and Scimitar, 1st edition. New York. ISBN 978-0-306-82555-2.
- Janin, Raymond (1964). Constantinople Byzantine (in French) (2 ed.). Paris: Institut Français d'Etudes Byzantines.
- Klein, Konstantin M.: Wienand, Johannes (2022) (eds.): City of Caesar, City of God: Constantinople and Jerusalem in Late Antiquity. De Gruyter, Berlin 2022, ISBN 978-3-11-071720-4. doi: City of Caesar, City of God.
- Korolija Fontana-Giusti, Gordana 'The Urban Language of Early Constantinople: The Changing Roles of the Arts and Architecture in the Formation of the New Capital and the New Consciousness' in Intercultural Transmission in the Medieval Mediterranean, (2012), Stephanie L. Hathaway and David W. Kim (eds), London: Continuum, pp 164–202. ISBN 978-1-4411-3908-5.
- Mamboury, Ernest (1953). The Tourists' Istanbul. Istanbul: Çituri Biraderler Basımevi.
- Mansel, Philip (1998). Constantinople: City of the World's Desire, 1453–1924. St. Martin's Griffin. ISBN 978-0-312-18708-8.
- Meyendorff, John (1996). Rome, Constantinople, Moscow: Historical and Theological Studies. Crestwood, NY: St. Vladimir's Seminary Press. ISBN 9780881411348.
- Müller-Wiener, Wolfgang (1977). Bildlexikon zur Topographie Istanbuls: Byzantion, Konstantinupolis, Istanbul bis zum Beginn d. 17 Jh (in German). Tübingen: Wasmuth. ISBN 978-3-8030-1022-3.
- Phillips, Jonathan (2005). The Fourth Crusade and the Sack of Constantinople. Pimlico. ISBN 978-1-84413-080-1.
- Runciman, Steven (1990). The Fall of Constantinople, 1453. Cambridge University Press. ISBN 978-1-84413-080-1.
- Treadgold, Warren (1997). A History of the Byzantine State and Society. Stanford University Press. ISBN 978-0-8047-2630-6.
- Yule, Henry (1915). Henri Cordier (ed.), Cathay and the Way Thither: Being a Collection of Medieval Notices of China, Vol I: Preliminary Essay on the Intercourse Between China and the Western Nations Previous to the Discovery of the Cape Route. London: Hakluyt Society. Accessed 21 September 2016.
