= Stephen of Novgorod =

14th-century Russian traveller to Constantinople

Stephen of Novgorod (fl. 14th century) was a Russian traveller to Constantinople who wrote an account of the city called the Wanderer.

Stephen was a layman. He arrived in Constantinople on Holy Thursday in 1348 or 1349. He probably travelled on official business, perhaps to defend the diocese of Novgorod from the claims of the metropolitan of Moscow. He may have brought monies for the repair of the dome of the Hagia Sophia, which partially collapsed in 1346. During Holy Week festivities, he kissed the hand of Patriarch Isidore I of Constantinople. He stayed in the city for about seven days. He travelled with an entourage.

The title Wanderer (Странник) is known from a single manuscript. Some manuscripts leave the impression that Stephen later travelled to the Holy Land and wrote an account of it, but this is unlikely. The Wanderer is written in vernacular Northwest Russian. As a layman, Stephen incorporated relatively few scriptural quotations or Church Slavonic idioms. His interests, however, were those of a pilgrim, that is, the city's shrines and relics. He evidently used the service of tour guides in the city, since he remarks on the expense:

Entering Constantinople is like [entering] a great forest; it is impossible to get around without a good guide, and if you attempt to get around stingily or cheaply you will not be able to see or kiss a single saint unless it happens to be the holiday of that saint when [you can] see and kiss [the relics].

== Bibliography ==
- Carr, Annemarie Weyl (2022). "Pilgrimage to Constantinople". In Sarah Bassett (ed.). The Cambridge Companion to Constantinople. Cambridge University Press. pp. 310–323.
- Koutrakou, Nike (2022). "Medieval Travellers to Constantinople: Wonders and Wonder". In Sarah Bassett (ed.). The Cambridge Companion to Constantinople. Cambridge University Press. pp. 295–309.
- Majeska, George P., ed. (1984). Russian Travelers to Constantinople in the Fourteenth and Fifteenth Centuries. Dumbarton Oaks.
- Majeska, George P. (2002). "Russian Pilgrims in Constantinople". Dumbarton Oaks Papers. 56: 93–108. doi:10.2307/1291857. JSTOR 1291857.
- Ševčenko, Ihor (1953). "Notes on Stephen, the Novgorodian Pilgrim to Constantinople in the XIV Century". Südost-Forschungen. 12: 165–175.
