= Rosand =

Rosand is a surname. Notable people with the surname include:

- Aaron Rosand (1927–2019), American classical violinist
- David Rosand (1938–2014), American art historian, academic, and writer
- Ellen Rosand, American musicologist, historian, and opera critic
- Jonathan Rosand, American neurologist, scientist, and professor
