= Symbolism of domes =

The symbolic meaning of the dome has developed over millennia. Although the precise origins are unknown, a mortuary tradition of domes existed across the ancient world, as well as a symbolic association with the sky. Both of these traditions may have a common root in the use of the domed hut, a shape which was associated with the heavens and translated into tombs.

The mortuary tradition has been expressed in domed mausolea, martyria, and baptisteries. The celestial symbolism was adopted by rulers in the Middle East to emphasize their divine legitimacy and was inherited by later civilizations down to the present day as a general symbol of governmental authority.

== Origins ==
The meaning of the dome has been extensively analyzed by architectural historians. According to Nicola Camerlenghi, it may not be possible to arrive at a single "fixed meaning and universal significance" for domes across all building types and locations throughout history, since the shape, function, and context for individual buildings were determined locally, even if inspired by distant predecessors, and meaning could change over time. Cyril Mango wrote that a symbolic interpretation of architecture was consistent with "the workings of the medieval mind", although simply accepting a celestial meaning of the dome and an imperial connotation for the ciborium, for example, did not explain the variety of forms. Yasser Tabbaa considered domes to be the "ultimate aesthetic statements of many architectural traditions and as repositories of iconography and cosmology".

=== Mortuary tradition ===
According to E. Baldwin Smith, from the late Stone Age the dome-shaped tomb was used as a reproduction of the ancestral, god-given shelter made permanent as a venerated home of the dead and the instinctive desire to do this resulted in widespread domical mortuary traditions across the ancient world, from the stupas of India to the tholos tombs of Iberia. Gennaro Tampone wrote that early corbelled stone mortuary domes could have been meant to evoke the subterranean world, taking inspiration from caverns, although they sometimes reproduced features of contemporary dwellings.

Per Smith, by Hellenistic and Roman times, the domical tholos had become the customary cemetery symbol. Jodi Magness noted that domed ceilings in Jewish catacombs in Rome displayed images of the menorah by the 3rd or 4th century in order to evoke the Temple and because the number seven represented, in the words of Rachel Elior, the "span of time needed for the transition from chaos to Creation, from impurity to purity and from death to life."

Lukas Nickel wrote that the conception of a round heaven over a square earth may have contributed to the Han Chinese' rapid adoption in the first century AD of square base cloister vault chambers in their tomb architecture.

=== Celestial tradition ===
Smith wrote that in the process of transforming the hut shape from its original pliable materials into more difficult stone construction, the dome had also become associated with celestial and cosmic significance, as evident from decoration such as stars and celestial chariots on the ceilings of domed tombs. This cosmological thinking was not limited to domed ceilings, being part of a symbolic association between any house, tomb, or sanctuary and the universe as a whole, but it popularized the use of the domical shape. Gennaro Tampone noted that traditions of veneration or even worshipping of the dead would have linked a funerary meaning with a sacral meaning.

Michele Melaragno wrote that the nomadic tribes of central Asia are the origin of a symbolic tradition of round domed-tents being associated with the sky and heavens that eventually spread to the Middle East and the Mediterranean. Smith noted that one way the Romans depicted the celestial tent in architecture was as a corrugated or gored dome.

A circle

An octagon

A square

Theresa Grupico stated that domes and tent-canopies were also associated with the heavens in Ancient Persia and the Hellenistic-Roman world. A dome over a square base reflected the geometric symbolism of those shapes. The circle represented perfection, eternity, and the heavens. The square represented the earth. An octagon was intermediate between the two. Ancient peoples associated the circle with the cosmos, according to Jack Tresidder, due to the shapes of the sun and moon, because it is a form that has no beginning or end, because of the cyclical movements of the planets, and because of the cycle of the seasons. Circular domes incorporated this celestial symbolism.

Karl Lehmann stated that both pagan and Christian use of domes reflected a vision of the "physical as well as the transcendental celestial realm." A "cosmic interpretation of the dome remained common well into the eighteenth century," according to Rudolf Wittkower.

== Divine ruler ==
Herbert Howe wrote that throughout the Middle East domes were symbolic of "the tent of the ruler, and especially of the god who dwells in the tent of the heavens." Passages in the Old Testament and intertestamental literature document this, such as Psalms 123:1, (Note: Psalms 123:1, King James Version: "Unto thee lift I up mine eyes, O thou that dwellest in the heavens.") Isaiah 40:22, (Note: Isaiah 40:22, King James Version: "It is he that sitteth upon the circle of the earth, and the inhabitants thereof are as grasshoppers; that stretcheth out the heavens as a curtain and spreadeth them out as a tent to dwell in.") I Kings 8:30, (Note: I Kings 8:30, King James Version: "Hear thou in heaven thy dwelling place.") Isaiah 66:1, (Note: Isaiah 66:1, King James Version: "Heaven is my throne and earth is my footstool.") Psalms 19:4, (Note: Psalms 19:4, King James Version: "In [the heaven] hath he set a tabernacle for the sun.") and Job 22:14. (Note: Job 22:14, King James Version: "He walketh in the circuit of heaven.") Michele Melaragno wrote that Persian kings used domed tents in their official audiences to symbolize their divinity, and this practice was adopted by Alexander the Great. According to Michael Walter, a tradition of the "golden dome" identifying the ruler with the cosmos, sun, and astrological values originated in Persia and spread to later Roman and Turkic courts.

According to Smith, the distinct symbolism of the heavenly or cosmic tent stemming from the royal audience tents of Achaemenid and Indian rulers was adopted by Roman rulers in imitation of Alexander, becoming the imperial baldachin. This probably began with Nero, whose Domus Aurea, meaning "Golden House", also made the dome a feature of Roman palace architecture. According to Nicholas Temple, Nero's octagonal domed room in his Domus Aurea was an early example of an imperial reception hall, the symbolism of which "signaled an elevation of the status of the emperor as living deity, which in the case of Nero related specifically to his incarnation as Helios and the Persian Mithra." Melaragno wrote that the allegory of Alexander the Great's domical tent in Roman imperial architecture coincided with the "divinification" of Roman emperors and served as a symbol of this. The domical octagonal hall in the Flavian Domus Augustana is another example of the octagon's imperial symbolism in antiquity, which Temple says may have been related to hero ruler-ship, mediation between the terrestrial and celestial, or the divine harmony of the octave. Colum Hourihane wrote that the semi-domed apse became a symbol of Roman imperial authority under Domitian and depictions into the Byzantine period used overhead domes or semidomes to identify emperors.

Dome of the Pantheon in Rome

The meaning of the Pantheon appears to have been uncertain even to the Romans within a century of its construction and remains a mystery. Christiane Joost-Gaugier suggested that the dome of the Pantheon represented the accord of the sun and the moon because of references to Pythagorean numerology, with the single oculus representing the sun, the 28 columns of coffers representing the moon due to the days in the lunar month, and the five rows of coffers representing marriage due to the inclusion in five of two and three (female and male). The dome was a hemisphere because the sphere was to the Pythagoreans the perfect form and represented the universe. Giangiacomo Martines wrote that the use of the number 28 in the dome represented perfection because it was considered a perfect number going back to the Pythagoreans and was "associated with virtue, moderation, and beauty". Edmund Thomas noted that the five rows of coffers correspond to the five planets recognized by the ancient Romans. He wrote that the dome was "dominated centrally by the intrusion of the real sun" and that the 28 sets of coffers corresponded to the phases of the moon. Robert Hannah and Giulio Magli proposed that light from the Pantheon's oculus would illuminate the entrance on the traditional anniversary of the founding of Rome and could have been used to symbolize the inclusion among the gods of an emperor standing there as part of a ceremony.

Edmund Thomas wrote that Roman arcuated lintels and domes were used as canopies for the statues of gods, but "cosmic imagery and ciborium forms" were linked to the worship of the emperor under Antoninus Pius, who issued a coin with a cusped dome that "associated the emperor with the light and power of the sun". Karl Swoboda wrote that even by the time of Diocletian, the dome probably symbolized sovereignty over the whole world. Nicholas Temple stated that Roman imperial reception halls or throne rooms were often domed with circular or octagonal plans and "functioned as a ceremonial space between the emperor, his court and the gods", becoming a common feature of imperial palaces from the time of Constantine onwards.

The domed throne room of Sassanid Persian king Khusrau, decorated with the image of the king alongside "heavenly luminaries (including the signs of the zodiac)", was given by Jodi Magness as an example of the cosmic dome decoration originating in the ancient Near East that "was designed as an earthly reflection of the heavenly hierarchy."

== Christianity ==
E. Baldwin Smith wrote that, by the Christian era, "cosmic imagery had come to transcend the mortuary, divine and royal symbolism already associated with the dome" but the Christian use of domes acknowledged earlier symbolic associations. Thomas Mathews wrote that Christianity's rejection of astrology was reflected in the omission of signs of the zodiac imagery from its dome decoration. According to Gillian MacKie, early Christian domes were often decorated at the base with imagery of the Four Evangelists, symbolizing "the idea that the microcosmic vision of heaven was supported by the word of God as revealed in the Gospels."

According to Susan Balderstone, domed centralized plans, whether octagonal, circular, or tetraconch, were "associated with the influence of Arianism in the fourth century and with the Monophysites in the fifth century." Robert Stalley wrote that mausolea, martyria, and baptisteries shared similar forms in the Roman architectural tradition as domed centralized plans due to representing the linked ideas of "death, burial, resurrection, and salvation".

=== Martyria ===
Smith wrote that the dual sepulchral and heavenly symbolism was adopted by early Christians in both the use of domes in architecture and in the ciborium, a domical canopy like the baldachin used as a ritual covering for relics or the church altar. The traditional mortuary symbolism led the dome to be used in Christian central-type martyria in the Syrian area, the growing popularity of which spread the form. The spread and popularity of the cult of relics also transformed the domed central-type martyria into the domed churches of mainstream Christianity. According to Nicholas Temple, the use of centralized buildings for the burials of heroes was common by the time the Anastasis Rotunda was built in Jerusalem, but the use of centralized domed buildings to symbolize resurrection was a Christian innovation. Richard Krautheimer noted that the octagonal pattern of Roman mausolea corresponded to the Christian idea of the number eight symbolizing spiritual regeneration.

=== Baptisteries ===
In Italy in the 4th century, baptisteries began to be built like domed mausolea and martyria, which spread in the 5th century. Smith wrote that this reinforced the theological emphasis on baptism as a re-experience of the death and resurrection of Jesus Christ. Krautheimer wrote that "baptism is the death of the old Adam and the resurrection of the new man; eight is the symbolic number of regeneration, salvation, and resurrection, as the world started the eighth day after creation began, and Christ rose from the dead on the eighth day of the Passion." According to Miša Rakocija, octagonal baptisteries originated in Milan, Rome, and Ravenna and were typical for the western empire, but rare in the eastern empire. Theresa Grupico stated that the octagon, which is transitional between the circle and the square, came to represent Jesus' resurrection in early Christianity and was used in the ground plans of martyria and baptisteries for that reason. The domes themselves were sometimes octagonal, rather than circular. Nicholas Temple proposed the imperial reception hall as an additional source of influence on baptisteries, conveying the idea of reception or redemptive passage to salvation. Iconography of assembled figures and the throne of Christ would also relate to this.

=== Throne halls ===
Michele Melaragno wrote that the concept of "Christ the King" was the Christian counterpoint to the Roman tradition of emperor deification and so absorbed the dome symbolism associated with it. The Byzantine Chrysotriklinos, wrote Nigel Westbrook, combined the functions of Constantine's Octagon, a throne room, and an audience hall in a centralized space. The imperial throne's position in front of an icon of Christ in the apse semidome "expressed the Emperor's role as Vice-Regent, his authority derived from divine sanction". According to Westbrook, "the Emperor is both secular and spiritual ruler, but under God’s dispensation, symbolized both by the ikon and by the ceiling depicted as the dome of heaven".

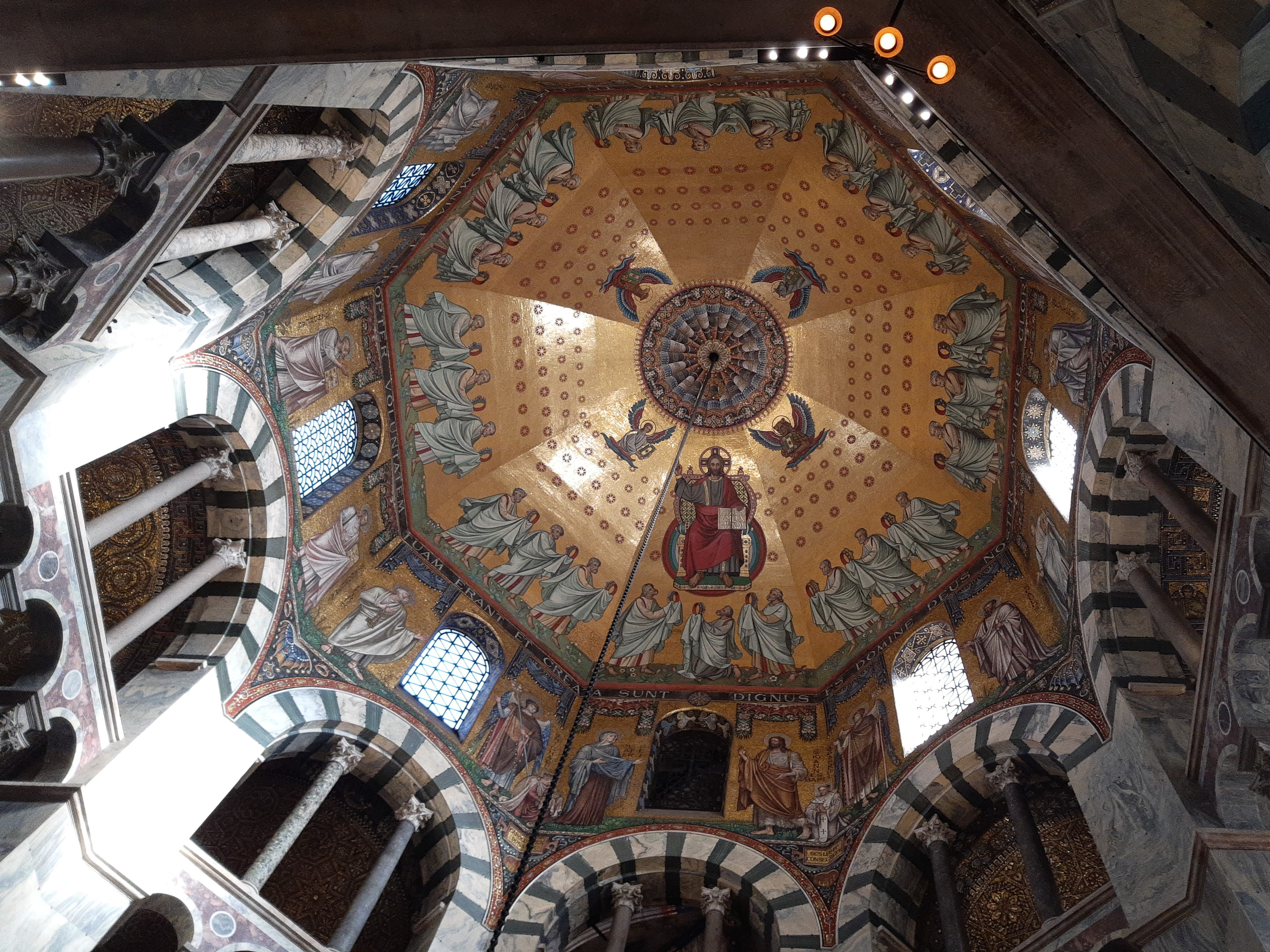
Octagonal dome of the Palatine Chapel at Aachen

E. Baldwin Smith wrote that "[i]n the West during the Carolingian period the churchmen and rulers revived, or took over from the Byzantine East, the use of cupolas as a mark of royal and divine presence." Like the throne room of the Eastern Roman emperor, Charlemagne's throne in the Palatine Chapel at Aachen was located in a domed octagonal space. In the words of Allan George Doig, the throne at Aachen was located in "an intermediary place between earth and heaven" on the gallery level, directly across from an image of Christ's throne on the dome. According to Jodi Magness, the dome's image of Christ on a throne referred to a passage about the apocalypse from the Book of Revelation. (Note: Revelation 4:2, King James Version: "And immediately I was in the spirit: and, behold, a throne was set in heaven, and one sat on the throne.") According to Herbert Schutz, the symbolism of the octagon at Aachen related to the emperor's role as God's representative on Earth in achieving a universal "Imperium Christianum" and the geometry of objects and architecture acted as a "wordless text" to suggest ideas, such as the "renovatio imperii". Winand Klassen wrote that the domed space symbolized the dual secular and divine nature of the restored empire.

=== Churches ===
==== Middle Ages ====
Literary evidence exists that the idea of the cosmic temple had been applied to the Christian basilica by the end of the 4th century, in the form of a speech by Eusebius on a church in Tyre. However, it is only in the mid 6th century that the earliest literary evidence of a cosmological interpretation of a domed church building exists, in a hymn composed for the cathedral church of Edessa. Kathleen E. McVey traced this to a blending by Jacob of Serugh of the two major but contradictory schools of biblical exegesis at the time: the building-as-microcosm tradition of the Antioch school combined with the Alexandrian view of the cosmos and firmament as composed of spheres and hemispheres, which was rejected by the Antioch school.

Gold was used as the color of Heaven, and Charles Stewart noted that the emphasis on light from windows beneath the domes of Justinian's imperial commissions corresponds to the Neo-Platonist idea of light as a symbol of wisdom. Andrzej Piotrowski wrote that Byzantine churches after Justinian's Hagia Sophia often had gold-covered domes with a ring of windows and that gold, as "the most precious metal and the paradigm of purity, was a sign of light and divinity in the writings of St. Basil and Pseudo-Dionysius. It 'does not rust, decompose, or wear and can be beaten to the fineness of air. Gold was used to invoke the transcendental nature of the Incarnate Christ.'" The use of silver in mosaic was limited by the difficulty in fusing it to glass tesserae, but it was mostly employed to represent theophany. Divine light could also be represented in dome mosaics with a multi-colored rainbow pattern.

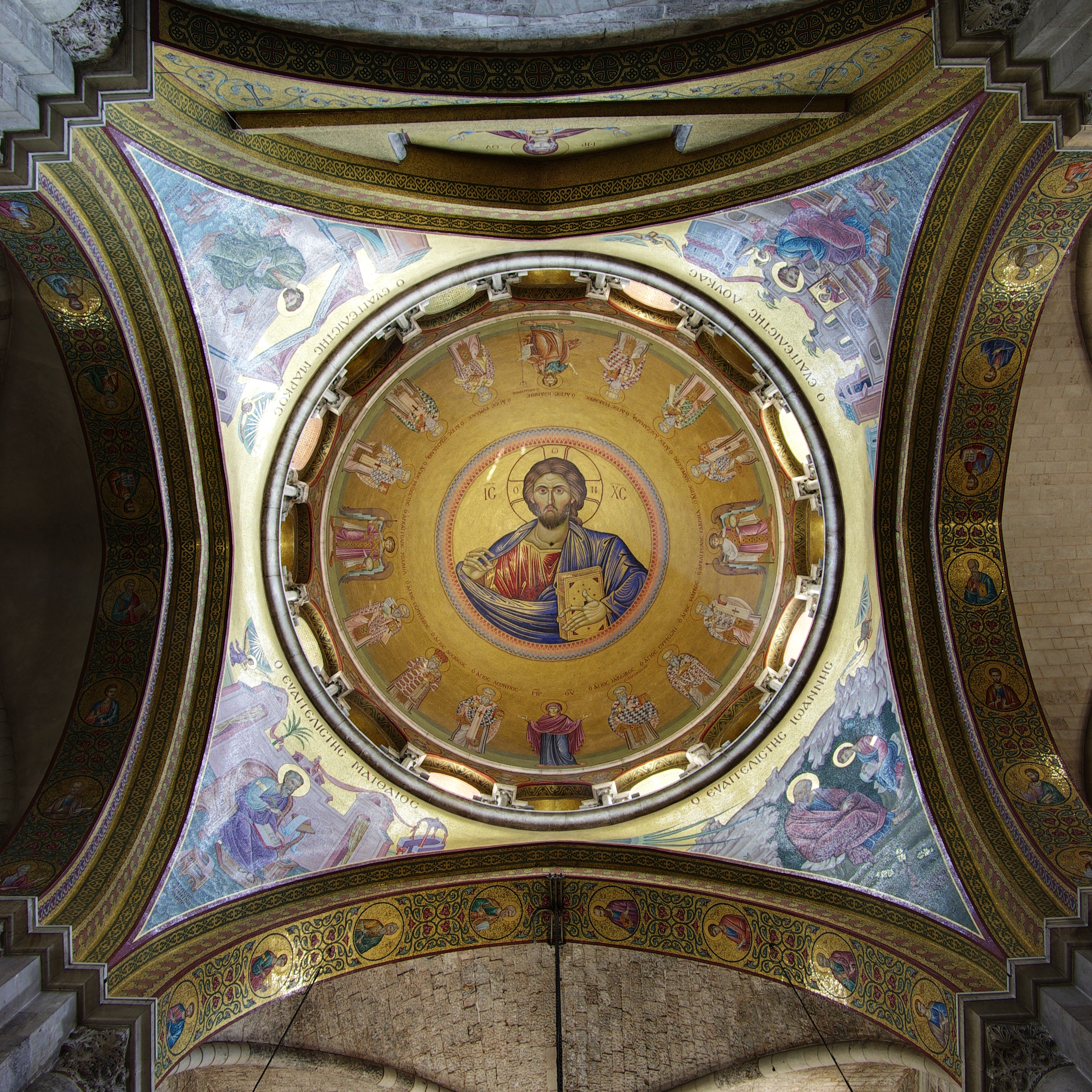
Catholicon dome at the Church of the Holy Sepulchre in Jerusalem, with an image of Christ Pantocrator against a gold background and images of the Four Evangelists in the pendentives

Beginning in the late eighth century, portraits of Christ began to replace gold crosses at the centers of church domes, which Charles Stewart suggested may have been an over-correction in favor of images after the periods of Iconoclasm in the eighth and ninth centuries. One of the first was on the nave dome of Hagia Sophia in Thessaloniki, and this eventually developed into the bust image known as the Pantokrator. Otto Demus wrote that Middle Byzantine churches were decorated in a systematic manner and can be seen as having three zones of decoration, with the holiest at the top. This uppermost zone contained the dome, drum and apse. The dome was reserved for the Pantokrator (meaning "ruler of all"), the drum usually contained images of angels or prophets, and the apse semi-dome usually depicted the Virgin Mary, typically holding the Christ Child and flanked by angels. Maria Evangelatou wrote that, during the growth of her cult after the end of Iconoclasm in the ninth century, Mary became the most commonly depicted figure in the apse semi-dome for a number of reasons, including that her power as intercessor for the faithful lent itself to depictions on such a focal point for the congregation and that her role in the Incarnation and role as a bridge between heaven and earth were reinforced by the location of the apse just below the dome.

Anna Freze wrote that the octagonal churches and octagon domed churches of the Byzantine Empire during the 9th to 11th centuries were closely linked to imperial commissions. The octagonal patterns were mean to convey "the idea of basilea as the sacral power and status of a Byzantine emperor" and the octagon, also being a symbol of regeneration, suggests an origin for this in the architectural restorations of Basil I following the iconoclast periods. Paul Magdalino wrote that the five domes of Basil's Nea Ekklesia, consecrated in 880 in the aftermath of the Photian schism, may have represented the unity of the five Patriarchates from the Council of 879. If the central dome was larger, it may have related to the primacy of the Pope, which was acknowledged by Photios at the council.

Nebojša Stanković wrote that Byzantine domes over the narthex or entrance to a church represented, as early as the 11th century, a royal canopy that "most likely framed the emperor’s actual and expected visits to and presence in the church, either at the entrance or in the gallery".

Barry Bridgwood and Lindsay Lennie wrote that the domes of Eastern Orthodox church architecture followed the influence of Eastern Orthodoxy into central and eastern Europe and that the architectural differences with Western church architecture are analogous to the theological schism between the Western and Eastern Churches. Nicola Camerlenghi wrote that domes were status symbols among the competing cities and communes of medieval Italy and this contributed to the boom in dome construction there beginning in the 11th century.

==== Renaissance ====
Wolfgang Born wrote that, according to Walter Tunk, the bulbous dome in Germanic nations in the early Renaissance was due to the influence of Venetian architecture, and the "Bavarian type of the bulbous dome is said to have originated from a fusion between a pointed spire and a dome." Born instead concluded that a "bulbous cupola recalled the Dome of the Rock to the mediaeval mind, and thus the Holy City generally" and that the bulbous cupolas of Bruges and Ghent were inspired by the bulbous pinnacles of Syrian and Egyptian minarets. Hans Schindler stated that "the onion spire carried the prestige of well-known pilgrimage churches and allowed a new church to indicate its kinship with them".

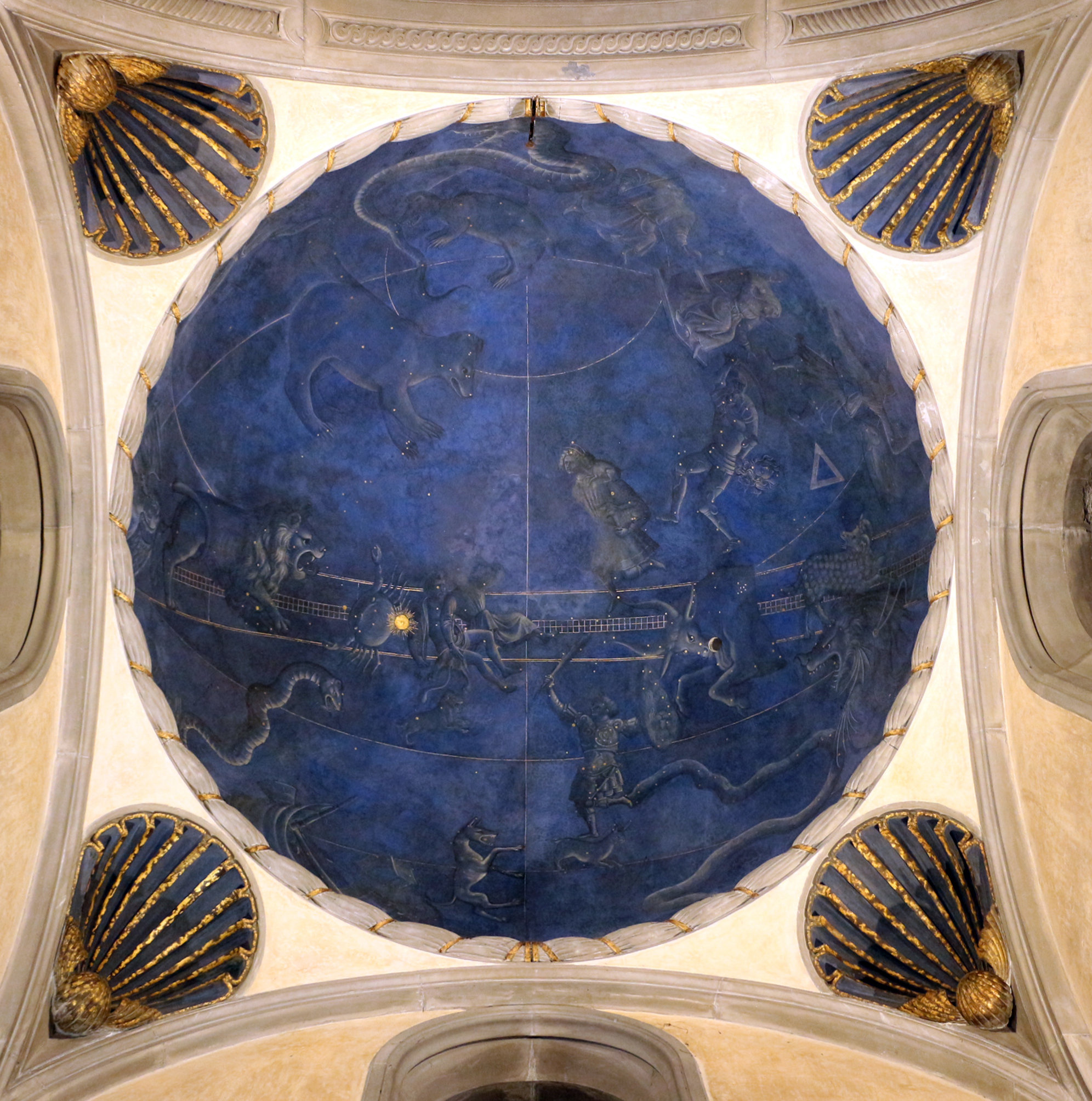
Dome above the altar of the Old Sacristy of the Basilica of San Lorenzo in Florence, commemorating the Council of Florence

According to James Mitchell, in the Renaissance the dome began to be a symbol throughout Europe of the unity of religion. The astrological depiction of star constellations in the small dome above the altar of the Old Sacristy of the Basilica of San Lorenzo in Florence, has been calculated by Patricia Fortini Brown to represent July 6, 1439 at about noon, the date of the closing session of the Council of Florence, in which the Articles of Union between Eastern and Western Christendom were signed by Latin and Greek delegates. The similar dome over the altar of the Pazzi Chapel in Florence, although of lesser quality, likely references the same date. Janna Israel wrote that the adoption of Byzantine architectural forms in Venice at the end of the fifteenth century, such as low domes on pendentives, helped "in the construction of a more harmonious and seamless history between Venice and Byzantium, glossing over the divisions that had actually defined the relationship between the two powers for almost a thousand years."

According to Linda Koch, it has been recognized that Renaissance humanism inspired a general revival of antiquity and attempted to reconcile Christianity with Roman paganism. Irene Giustina wrote that, in Renaissance Italy, the pointed dome was considered structurally safer but was also "against the rules of antique architecture". The pointed profile was considered barbarian and timburios were used as much to conceal the dome's shape externally as for structural reasons. Semicircular dome profiles were preferred. Valerie Shrimplin stated that a Renaissance revival of Neoplatonism was influential on the popularity of the circular form. Sylvie Duvernoy wrote that the 1450 architectural treatise written by Leon Battista Alberti was inspired by Vitruvius' ancient book De architectura but written from a humanist perspective and, unlike Vitruvius, advocated for central plans because the circle was "the favourite shape of nature". Of the nine church designs provided in the book, six were circular or polygonal centrally planned designs, with the polygonal shapes recommended to be drawn with equal angles so that they can be inscribed in a circle.

Rudolf Wittkower stated that Donato Bramante's plan for a Greek cross with a central dome for St. Peter's Basilica inspired the creation of domed Greek cross churches throughout Italy, acceptance of which was aided by the immigration of Greek scholars to Italy during the 15th century. Steve Choate wrote that Bramante's use of a hemispherical dome symbolized Rome's proud past and rising present, drawing parallels between the papacy and the ancient Roman Caesars. Nathaniel Curtis wrote that the large domes of the Renaissance implied "ideas of power, dominance or centralization – as the capitol of a nation or of a state." He noted that Guadet said of St. Peter's, "it is less the roof of the greatest of all churches than the covering and sign of this centre to which converges the entire unity of Catholicism."

Centrally planned churches in Europe spread from the middle of the fifteenth century onward as part of the Renaissance. Hubertus Günther noted that ancient Roman temples were mistakenly believed during the Renaissance to normally have been centralized buildings like the Pantheon, mostly round in plan but sometimes square. Ancient Greek temples were also mistaken to be centralized, domed, cross-in-square buildings, based on misreadings of Vitruvius by Fra Giocondo and Cesare Cesariano. Andrew Hopkins wrote that there was a tradition in the Renaissance of dedicating domed centralized churches to the Virgin Mary and this continued afterward, as evidenced by the justification given by Baldassare Longhena for his domed centralized church of Santa Maria della Salute in 1631. Longhena stated that his design for the church was based on its dedication to Mary and the rotunda's evocation of a crown. Rudolf Wittkower wrote that many centralized domed churches and sanctuaries dedicated to the Virgin Mary were related to the martyrium over her tomb, her assumption into heaven, and her status as Queen of Heaven.

Steve Choate wrote that Michelangelo's hemispherical dome design for St. Peter's Basilica symbolized universality and referenced the dome of the Roman Pantheon, although other elements of his design referenced the pointed dome of Florence Cathedral, such as the two shells, ribs, and dormer windows on the exterior surface. References to these two cities, Rome and Florence, represented references to separate centers of Classical ideology.

==== Counter-Reformation ====
Centralized buildings became controversial as part of a rethinking of the appropriateness of Greco-Roman classicism for Christian worship spaces following the Council of Trent (1545–1563), which began the Counter-Reformation of the Catholic Church in response to the Protestant Reformation. Jeanne Halgren Kilde wrote that, although early Christian centralized memorials and martyria were known and uncontroversial, the use of centralized spaces for worship was considered to have been a pagan practice. Kilde speculated that the adoption of centralized church plans by French Protestants after the Edict of Nantes may have been to distinguish themselves from Catholics, or the adoption may have influenced Catholics to emphasize a pagan nature for such centralized worship spaces. A blending of the domed centralized plan with the traditional cruciform plan would emerge, producing Catholic church buildings with both a centralized dome and longitudinal nave. Michał Kurzej argued that the domed transept likely "became a distinguishing feature of Roman Catholic Church buildings" in the 16th century and that imitation of Italian architecture outside of Italy at this time indicated partiality towards Roman Catholicism over Protestantism.

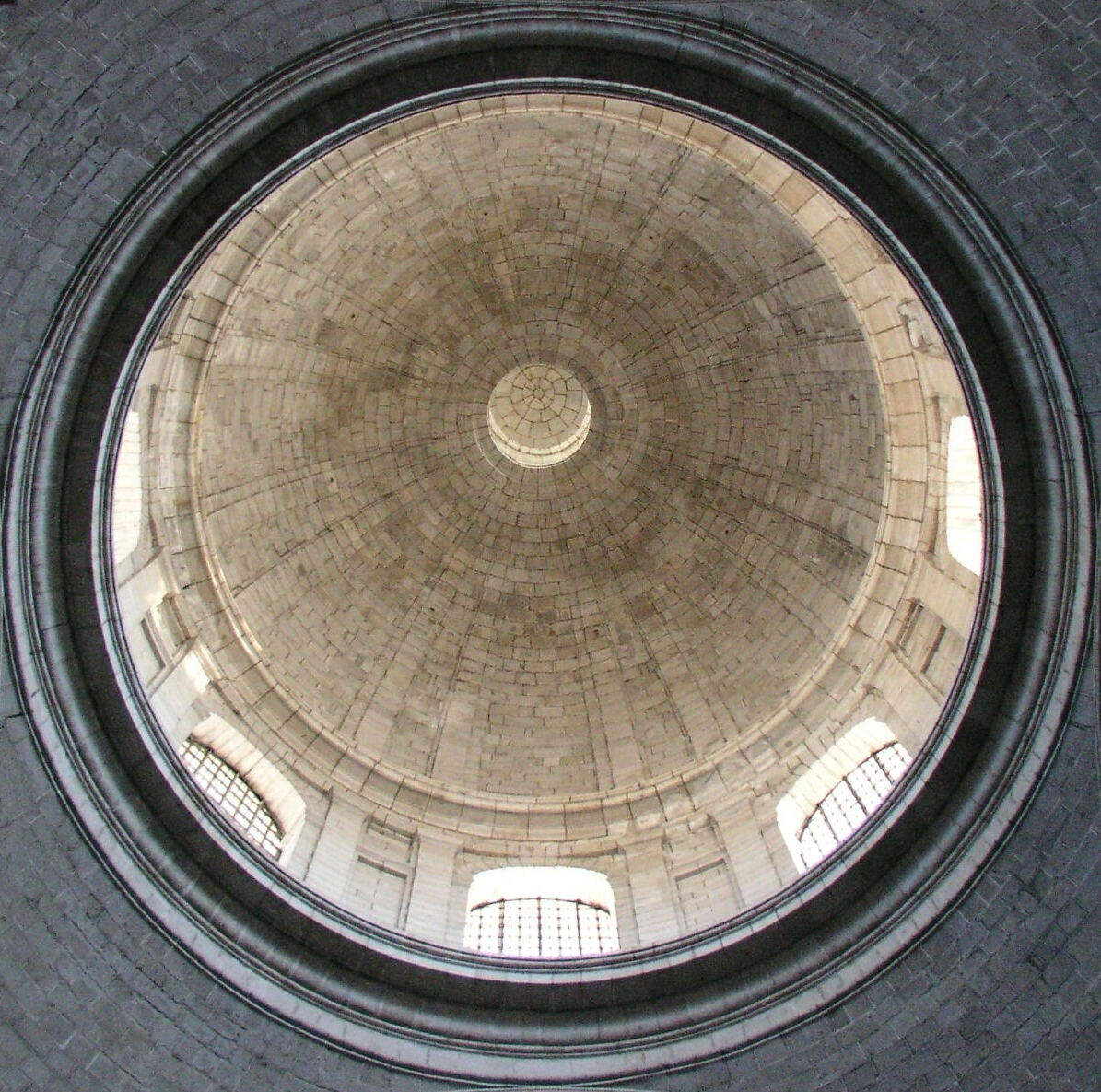
Dome of El Escorial in Spain

Salvatore Di Liello wrote that the Council of Trent prompted the creation of new lay and religious institutions that rejected luxury in architecture and built domes in simple, unadorned, and even ascetic styles, particularly in Naples. Peter Marshall reported that the design of El Escorial, including its central domed church, was requested by Charles V to have "simplicity in the construction, severity in the whole, nobility without arrogance, majesty without ostentation".

The appearance of the oval in architecture has been extensively discussed by architectural historians. Although not an idea originating in the Renaissance, by the beginning of the 1500s the idea of the oval was "in the air", according to Santiago Huerta. During the discussions of the Council of Trent, the circle and square were declared too pagan for Christian churches. Although the council did not make any direct pronouncements regarding architecture and, according to Hanno-Walter Kruft, the effects of those reforms actually adopted by the Council were varied, the one known written example of the Council's resolutions being applied to architecture, Cardinal Charles Borromeo's Instructiones fabricae et supellectilis ecclesiasticae of 1577, "condemns the circular form as heathenish." The publication was addressed only to Borromeo's own diocese of Milan, but gained currency throughout Europe. According to Michael Earls, the oval dome reconciled the "long axis, favored by the liturgy of the counter-reformation and the central plan so beloved by the spatial idealists."

The final design of the dome of St. Peter's Basilica, as built by Giacomo della Porta, replaced Michelangelo's semicircular central dome profile with one extended significantly higher and completed the front two smaller flanking domes. Steve Choate suggests that these changes were made by della Porta to reference the triple mountain motif on the coat of arms of his patron, Pope Sixtus V. The modification of St. Peter's Basilica to include an extended nave dates from the reign of Pope Paul V. The nave extension included oval domes over the bays of the side aisles.

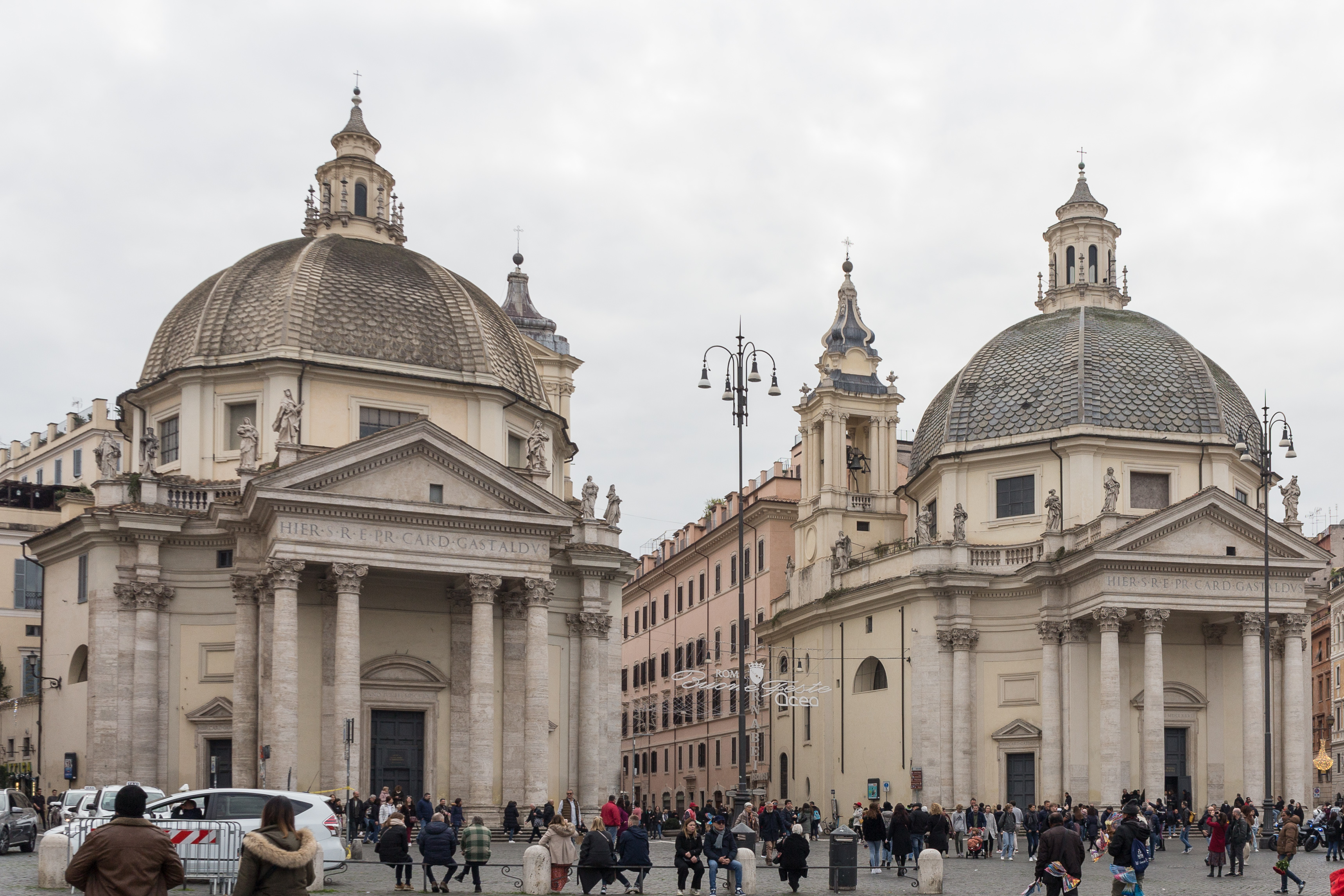
Santa Maria dei Miracoli and Santa Maria in Montesanto at the Piazza del Popolo in Rome

Victoria Hammond wrote that, in addition to the oval form's inherent appeal, its use in domes may have been influenced by the European Age of Exploration, as well as by the theory of the elliptical orbits of planets. Sylvie Duvernoy noted that, while Johannes Kepler was too young to have influenced the initial popularity of oval churches, the 1609 publication of his discovery of the elliptical motion of planets could have contributed to their persistence. Sylvie Duvernoy wrote that the use of a circular plan dome and an oval plan dome in the twin domed churches built at the northern entrance to the city of Rome between 1662 and 1679, Santa Maria dei Miracoli and Santa Maria in Montesanto, indicates that the two forms were then considered symbolically equivalent.

Zygmunt Łuniewicz wrote that the perceived antiquity of onion dome forms, their oriental associations, and the crusader-era bell tower of the Church of the Holy Sepulchre explains their use in Silesia on both sides of the Reformation. However, the "popularity of onion-shaped domes ended in the Netherlands at the beginning of the 17th century, when the real origins of the Dome of the Rock were discovered and its symbolic dimension was lost."

==== Eastern Orthodoxy ====
Nebojša Stanković stated that domes positioned in the narthex above an entrance in Serbian Empire churches were associated with royal imagery and symbolized continuity with Byzantine traditions that legitimized Serbian imperial authority.

Piotr Krasny wrote that the "five domes crowning traditional Ruthenian Orthodox churches were believed to symbolise the Five Patriarchs, who according to Orthodox ecclesiology wielded equal power in the Church. In the 17th century the five domes were replaced by one, symbolizing the pope's primacy, which was acknowledged by the Uniat Church." By 1880, Krasny wrote, the Ruthenians in Galicia held it was necessary to design churches with a dome in order to express the "relationship between the Greek Catholic rite and the East", and this was confirmed as obligatory in the 1891 Synod in Lviv.

Miecyzslaw Wallis wrote: "In old Russian temples, one dome would symbolize Christ, three, the Trinity, five, Christ and the four evangelists, thirteen domes, Christ and the twelve apostles."

== Islam ==
According to Oleg Grabar, the domes of the Islamic world, which rejected Christian-style iconography, continued the other traditions. Muslim royalty built palatial pleasure domes in continuation of the Roman and Persian imperial models, although many have not survived, and domed mausolea from Merv to India developed the form. Robert Hillenbrand noted that dome ceilings with solar or stellar decoration continued the symbolism of the dome of heaven, and the domed audience hall of the palace of Abu Muslim in Merv presented the ruler as cosmocrator.

According to Hillenbrand, understanding symbolic intent in Muslim architecture is made difficult by the lack of explicit evidence from literary sources, seemingly inconsistent associations between plan or elevation and symbolic meaning, and Islam's rejection of sculptural and figurative decoration. The lack of documentation and even tradition for such symbolism may indicate that the meaning was only ever intended for a small learned elite.

The Green Dome, built above the tomb of Muhammad, Abu Bakr and Umar in the Al-Masjid al-Nabawi (Prophet's Mosque) in Medina, Saudi Arabia, dates back to at least the 12th century.

Hillenbrand wrote that the understanding of color symbolism in Islam has suffered from a lack of literary evidence, but green floral patterns have been proposed as representing fertility and blue tilework proposed as representing good luck or heaven. Anwaar Mohyuddin and Nasra Khan noted that the color green, used on the dome of the Prophet's tomb, was associated with the Quraysh tribe of Muhammad, was purportedly his favorite color, and has become a symbol of Islam itself.

=== Royalty ===
Jonathan M. Bloom stated that the term qubbat al-khaḍrā' was used by medieval sources to describe features found in several early Muslim palaces and has been conventionally translated to mean "green dome". The conventional explanation for the term has been that early domes were made of timber covered with copper sheeting that gained a green patina over time. However, grammatical analysis of the Arabic term suggests that it had other possible meanings and he wrote that it may have been originally intended to convey something like "dome of heaven".

Bloom wrote that mosques did not normally have domes until the 11th century, perhaps because of the existing association of domes with palaces and tombs. Grabar emphasized that, in the early centuries of Islam, domes were closely associated with royalty. A dome built in front of the mihrab of a mosque, for example, was at least initially meant to emphasize the place of a prince during royal ceremonies. Over time such domes became primarily focal points for decoration or the direction of prayer. The use of domes in mausolea can likewise reflect royal patronage or be seen as representing the honor and prestige that domes symbolized, rather than having any specific funerary meaning.

According to Andrew Peterson, the wide variety of dome forms in medieval Islam reflected dynastic, religious, and social differences as much as practical building considerations. E. Baldwin Smith stated that the form of brick melon domes in the Near East with corrugations on the exterior may have been an extension of an earlier tradition of such domes in wood from the palace architecture of Alexandria. Smith also suggested that the "sculptured baldachins and cupolas" of Mughal architecture were an adoption from Ottoman architecture via traveling artists, craftsmen, and architects from the Ottoman court.

=== Theology ===
Camilla Edwards wrote that "the dome, and its decorative elements are fundamental to Islamic belief" and are often found in three structures that can serve as places of worship: mosques, madrasas, and mausolea. Doğan Kuban wrote that even seemingly minor variations in shape, structure, and functional use had theoretical implications, and were the "result of complex and culturally significant developments in the Islamic world, where the dome and minaret became symbols of Islam."

M. Anwarul Islam and Zaid F. Al-hamad noted that A. Y. Ali wrote that the "Oriental Throne is often octagonal and its bearers would be one at each corner" and suggested the octagonal shape of the Dome of the Rock and the difficulty in seeing the dome from inside the building corresponded to the building itself representing the throne of God on the Day of Judgement, as described in verses 15 to 18 of Surah Al-Haqqa of the Quran. (Note: Quran 69:15-18, Quran.com: "... on that Day the Inevitable Event will have come to pass. The sky will then be so torn that it will be frail, with the angels on its sides. On that Day eight mighty angels will bear the Throne of your Lord above them. You will then be presented before Him for judgment, and none of your secrets will stay hidden.") Theresa Grupico wrote that the use of the octagon in the Dome of the Rock, imperial funerary architecture, or mosque architecture may be a borrowing from earlier Byzantine or Persian use or reflect the idea of Paradise having "eight gardens with eight doors". Rina Avner wrote that the Dome of the Rock was designed to express the Muslim rejection of the Christian tenets of the divinity of Christ and the role of Mary as "God-bearer". Its octagonal shape likely referenced the Church of the Kathisma, an octagonal Christian shrine three miles away that was built around a rock said to have served as a seat for the Virgin Mary. The inner span of the Dome of the Rock is slightly wider that of the Church of the Kathisma. The dome of the Dome of the Rock has been compared to that of the nearby domed Church of the Anastasis. A 10th century source wrote that the Dome of the Rock "was meant to compete with and surpass the churches of Jerusalem in beauty, especially with respect to the overwhelming size of the dome of the Anastasis."

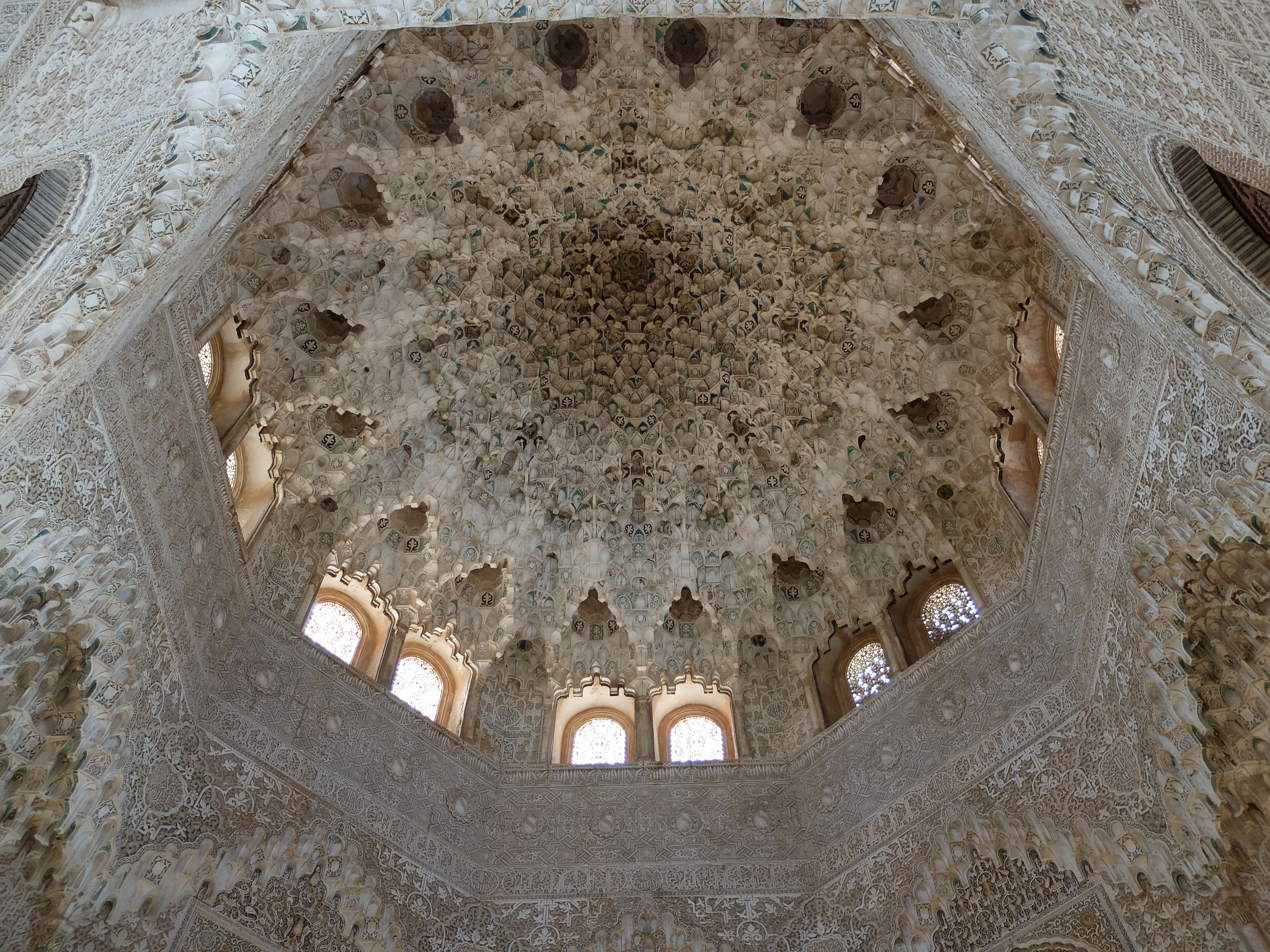
Muqarnas dome of the Hall of Two Sisters in the Alhambra palace

Oleg Grabar characterized forms in Islamic architecture as having relatively low levels of symbolism. While conceding this in a general sense, Yasser Tabbaa maintained that certain forms were initially very highly symbolic and only lost such associations over time. The phenomenon of muqarnas domes, in particular, was an example. Tabbaa explained the development and spread of muqarnas domes throughout the Islamic world beginning in the early 11th century as expressing a theological idea of the universe propounded by the Ash'arites (a modification of the Atomism of Aristotle with Occasionalism), which rose to prominence in Baghdad at this time. Only later was the style used in a purely decorative manner.

Tabbaa proposed that the unusual decoration of the dome of the Almoravid Qubba in Marrakesh, may have indicated the "Almoravid allegiance to the Abbasids as the symbolic rulers of Islam and the safeguard of Sunnism. More than just a dome above an ablution fountain, the Qubba was intended to pay homage to the Abbasid state and perhaps to evoke the pious acts of the Abbasids at the Haram of Mecca, allusions that perfectly coincide with the Almoravids' political and religious orientation."

Sabri Jarrar speculated that the use of domes on the Suq al-Ma'rifa at the Temple Mount symbolized the transmission of knowledge, a meaning that remained unique to that location until the single-domed chamber was adopted by the Ottomans for teaching functions.

Grupico wrote that Ottoman mosques, such as the Mosque of Suleyman the Great in Istanbul, have been interpreted as "challenging" the Hagia Sophia or "inviting similarities" of message beyond the merely visual. The use of Koranic text to decorate the pendentives of domes in the Islamic world replaced the human depictions of Christian iconography, such as the Four Evangelists, but similarly represented the way to the Word of God.

== Government ==
=== Early modern legislatures ===
Thomas Markus wrote that the dome became a symbol of democratic political power over the course of the eighteenth, nineteenth, and twentieth centuries.

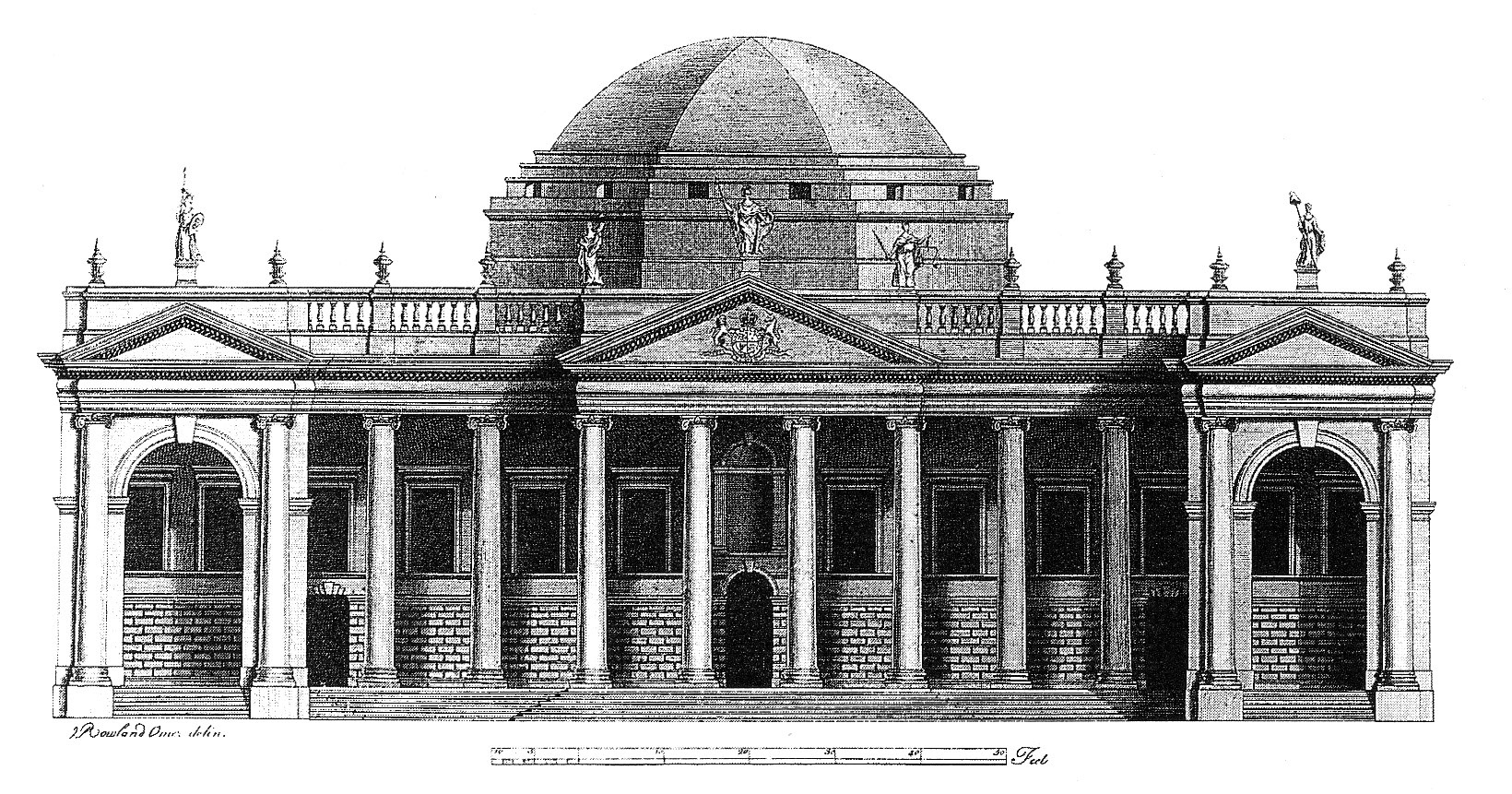
Drawing of the Irish Parliament House in Dublin

The Irish Parliament House in Dublin included an octagonal dome over a central chamber for the House of Commons. Edward McParland wrote that the location of the space, especially relative to the barrel-vaulted House of Lords, which was off axis on the east side of the building, may have symbolized a political dominance by the House of Commons.

Kendall Wallis wrote that the decision to build the national capitol building of the United States with a large dome "took a form laden with symbolic sacred meaning and ascribed a radically secular meaning to it." The decorative use of coffers was meant to evoke a connection with the classical origins of democracy and republicanism. "It represented the legislative power of the republic", sanctified. The ideas of religious association and sky symbolism also persisted in their resonance with the providential overtones of America's sense of its vocation in the world and, more pronounced in the state capitols, in the stars and sky scenes depicted on the domes. Those state capitol domes built after the American Civil War that resembled the second national capitol dome referred symbolically to the Federal government and so to the idea of "the Union". Charles Goodsell suggested a link between the function of a capitol as the "headquarters" of government, the root word of "capitol" being caput or "head", and the physical resemblance of a capitol dome to a great head.

=== Dictatorships ===
Richard Overy wrote that both Hitler and Stalin planned, but never completed, enormous domed assembly halls as part of their efforts to establish global capital cities. Hitler's Volkshalle, or "People's Hall", was meant to have a dome 250 meters wide and hold 200,000 people. The Palace of the Soviets in Moscow was meant to be the tallest building in the world, rising above a domed congress hall 100 meters wide for 21,000 world socialist delegates. The foundations were begun for the Palace of the Soviets on the site of the demolished Cathedral of Christ the Saviour, but technical problems postponed the project and it was abandoned after Stalin's death in the 1950s. Overy stated that these were meant to be monuments to dictatorship and utopian civilization that would last for ages.

=== Modern legislatures ===
According to Giovanni Rizzoni, although the dome traditionally represented absolute power, the modern glass dome of the German Reichstag building expressed both the sovereignty of the people, who as tourists are literally above the legislature while touring the dome, and the accessibility of parliamentary democracy, due to the transparency of the glass dome and the window it provides into the legislative chamber below.

William Seale wrote that the dome was an accepted architectural symbol across the world for democratic legislatures.

== Bibliography ==
- Arentzen, Thomas; Cunningham, Mary B. (2019). The Reception of the Virgin in Byzantium. Cambridge University Press. ISBN 978-1-108-47628-7.
- Avner, Rina (2010). "The Dome of the Rock in light of the development of concentric martyria in Jerusalem: architecture and architectural iconography". Muqarnas. 27. Brill: 31–49. doi:10.1163/22118993_02701003. JSTOR 25769691.
- Balderstone, Susan (2024). "Architectural expression of liturgy and doctrine in the Eastern churches of the fourth to sixth centuries: towards a theologically contextual typology". Buried History. 40: 29–38. doi:10.62614/60hcjq27.
- Bloom, Jonathan M. (1993). "The Qubbat al-Khaḍrā' and the Iconography of Height in Early Islamic Architecture". Ars Orientalis. 23: 135–141. JSTOR 4629445.
- Born, Wolfgang (April 1944). "The Introduction of the Bulbous Dome into Gothic Architecture and its Subsequent Development". Speculum. 19 (2): 208–221. doi:10.2307/2849071. JSTOR 2849071. S2CID 162699497.
- Bridgwood, Barry; Lennie, Lindsay (2013). History, Performance and Conservation. New York: Taylor & Francis. ISBN 978-1-134-07900-1.
- Brown, Patricia Fortini (1981). "Laetentur Caeli: The Council of Florence and the Astronomical Fresco in the Old Sacristy". Journal of the Warburg and Courtauld Institutes. 44. The Warburg Institute: 176–180. doi:10.2307/751062. JSTOR 751062. S2CID 195024597.
- Camerlenghi, Nicola (2019). "The Millennial Gap in Dome Construction in Rome". Gesta. 58 (2). University of Chicago Press: 103–135. doi:10.1086/704636. S2CID 211439130.
- Choate, Steve B. (1996). "Bramante, Michelangelo and Giacomo Della Porta: The Meaning of the Dome". Athanor. 14. Museum Press of the Florida State University Museum of Fine Arts: 21–29. ISSN 0732-1619.
- Courier, Nathaniel Courtland (2013). The Secrets of Architectural Composition. Courier Corporation. ISBN 978-0-486-32074-8.
- Di Liello, Salvatore (2018). "Roman influences in the architecture of domes in Naples at the turn of the XVIth century". Eikonocity. III (2). FeDOA Press - Centro di Ateneo per le Biblioteche dell’Università di Napoli Federico II: 21–34. doi:10.6092/2499-1422/5859.
- Doig, Allan George (2015), "Building, Enacting and Embodying Romanitas: the Throne of Charlemagne" (PDF), Actual Problems of Theory and History of Art, 5: 376–382, doi:10.18688/aa155-4-40
- Duvernoy, Sylvie (2015), "Baroque Oval Churches: Innovative Geometrical Patterns in Early Modern Sacred Architecture", Nexus Network Journal, 17 (2), Turin: Kim Williams Books: 425–456, doi:10.1007/s00004-015-0252-x, S2CID 117975966
- Earls, Michael W. (1971). "The Development of Structural Form in Franconian Rococo". In Malo, Paul (ed.). Essays to D. Kenneth Sargent. Syracuse, NY: The School of Architecture, Syracuse University. pp. 127–139.
- Edwards, Camilla (2000), "Islamic Domes", Domes. Papers Read at the Annual Symposium of the Society of Architectural Historians of Great Britain., Society of Architectural Historians of Great Britain, pp. 27–41
- Freze, Anna (2015), "Byzantine Octagon Domed Churches of the 11th Century and the Roman Imperial Architecture", Actual Problems of Theory and History of Art, 5, St. Petersburg State University: 277–286, doi:10.18688/aa155-2-28
- Giustina, Irene (2003), "On the art and the culture of domes. Construction in Milan and Lombardy in the late sixteenth and in the first half of the seventeenth century" (PDF), Proceedings of the First International Congress on Construction History, Madrid, Spain: Sociedad Española de Historia de la Construcción, pp. 1033–1042
- Goodsell, Charles T. (Winter 1993). "Political Meanings of the American State Capitol". Journal of Architectural and Planning Research. 10 (4). Locke Science Publishing Company, Inc.: 294–307. JSTOR 43029096.
- Grabar, Oleg (December 1963). "The Islamic Dome, Some Considerations". Journal of the Society of Architectural Historians. 22 (4): 191–198. doi:10.2307/988190. JSTOR 988190.
- Grabar, Oleg (March 1990). "From Dome of Heaven to Pleasure Dome". Journal of the Society of Architectural Historians. 49 (1). University of California Press: 15–21. doi:10.2307/990496. JSTOR 990496.
- Grupico, Theresa (2011). "The Dome in Christian and Islamic Sacred Architecture" (PDF). The Forum on Public Policy. 2011 (3): 14. Archived from the original (PDF) on November 29, 2014.
- Günther, Hubertus (1995). "Leitende Bautypen in der Planung der Peterskirche" [Leading Building Types in the Planning of St. Peter's Basilica] (PDF). L'Église dans l'architecture de la Renaissance (in German). Picard, Paris (FRA): 41–78.
- Hannah, Robert; Magli, Giulio (2011). "The Role of the Sun in the Pantheon's Design and Meaning" (PDF). Numen. 58. Brill: 486–513.
- Hillenbrand, Robert (1994). Islamic Architecture: Form, Function, and Meaning. New York: Columbia University Press. ISBN 978-0-231-10133-2.
- Hopkins, Andrew (1997). "Plans and Planning for S. Maria della Salute, Venice". The Art Bulletin. 79 (3). CAA: 440–465. doi:10.2307/3046261. JSTOR 3046261.
- Hourihane, Colum, ed. (2012). The Grove Encyclopedia of Medieval Art and Architecture. Oxford University Press. ISBN 978-0-19-539536-5.
- Howe, Herbert M. (1966). "The Dome of Clement". Transactions and Proceedings of the American Philological Association. 97. Baltimore, MD: The Johns Hopkins University Press: 261–273. doi:10.2307/2936010. JSTOR 2936010.
- Huerta, Santiago (2007). "Oval Domes: History, Geometry and Mechanics". Nexus Network Journal. Vol. 9. SAHGB Publications Limited. pp. 211–248. doi:10.1007/978-3-7643-8699-3_4. ISBN 978-3-7643-8444-9.
- Incerti, Manuela; Ranfagni, Piero; Bònoli, Fabrizio (2025). "Digital Survey of the Celestial Dome in the Old Sacristy of San Lorenzo in Florence: First Results and Considerations". Nuncius. 40 (2). Brill: 460–501. doi:10.1163/18253911-bja10155.
- Islam, M. Anwarul; Al-Hamad, Zaid F. (2007). "The Dome of the Rock: Origin of its Octagonal Plan". Palestine Exploration Quarterly. 139 (2). Taylor & Francis Group: 109–128. doi:10.1179/003103207x194145.
- Israel, Janna (2012). "A History Built on Ruins: Venice and the Destruction of the Church of the Holy Apostles in Constantinople". Future Anterior: Journal of Historic Preservation, History, Theory, and Criticism. 9 (1). University of Minnesota Press: 107–122. doi:10.5749/futuante.9.1.0107. JSTOR 10.5749/futuante.9.1.0107. S2CID 151195862.
- Jarrar, Sabri (1998). "Suq al-Maʾrifa: An Ayyubid Hanbalite Shrine in al-Haram al-Sharif". Muqarnas. 15. Brill: 71–100. doi:10.2307/1523278. JSTOR 1523278.
- Joost-Gaugier, Christiane L. (1998). "The Iconography of Sacred Space: A Suggested Reading of the Meaning of the Roman Pantheon". Artibus et Historiae. 19 (38). IRSA s.c.: 21–42. JSTOR 1483585.
- Kerr, S. (1989). Symmetry 2, Unifying Human Understanding (PDF). International Series in Modern Applied Mathematics and Computer Science. Pergamon. pp. 899–906. doi:10.1016/B978-0-08-037237-2.50059-3. ISBN 978-0-08-037237-2.
- Kilde, Jeanne Halgren (2008). Sacred Power, Sacred Space: An Introduction to Christian Architecture and Worship (illustrated ed.). Oxford, England: Oxford University Press. ISBN 978-0-195-33606-1.
- Klassen, Winand W. (1980). History of Western Architecture: A Semiological Approach to Architecture from a Designer's Point of View. University of San Carlos.
- Koch, Linda A. (September 1996). "The Early Christian Revival at S. Miniato al Monte: The Cardinal of Portugal Chapel". The Art Bulletin. 78 (3). CAA: 527–555. doi:10.2307/3046199. JSTOR 3046199. S2CID 192204259.
- Krasny, Piotr (1996). "Cultural and national identity in 18th-century Lwow: three nations – three religions – one art" (PDF). In Kwilecka, Anna; Ames-Lewis, Frances (eds.). Art and national identity in Poland and England. London: Birkbeck College. pp. 41–50.
- Krasny, Piotr (2003). "Architecture of the Ruthenian Greek Catholic Church in the Habsburg Monarchy ca. 1770-1914" (PDF). Centropa. A Journal of Central European Architecture and Related Arts. 3 (3): 194–207.
- Krautheimer, Richard (1942). "Introduction to an "Iconography of Mediaeval Architecture"". Journal of the Warburg and Courtauld Institutes. 5. The Warburg Institute: 1–33. doi:10.2307/750446. JSTOR 750446. S2CID 192272203.
- Krautheimer, Richard (1992). Ćurčić, Slobodan (ed.). Early Christian and Byzantine Architecture (unabridged ed.). Yale University Press. ISBN 9780300052947.
- Kruft, Hanno-Walter (1994). History of Architectural Theory (illustrated, reprint ed.). Princeton Architectural Press. ISBN 978-1-568-98010-2.
- Kuban, Doğan (1987). "The Style of Sinan's Domed Structures". Muqarnas. 4: 72–97. doi:10.2307/1523097. JSTOR 1523097.
- Kurzej, Michał (2015). "The Collegiate Church in Zamość in the Context of European Architecture". In Skowrońska, Renata; Flachenecker, Helmut (eds.). Leben zwischen und mit den Kulturen. Studien zu Recht, Bildung und Herrschaft in Mitteleuropa. Vol. 2. Toruń/Würzburg: Polska Misja Historyczna przy Uniwersytecie Juliusza Maksymiliana. pp. 169–186. ISBN 978-8-323-13491-6.
- Lehmann, Karl (1945). "The Dome of Heaven". The Art Bulletin. 27 (1). CAA: 1–27. doi:10.2307/3046977. JSTOR 3046977.
- Łuniewicz, Zygmunt (2016). "Nowożytne hełmy wieżowe na Śląsku – próba reinterpretacji pochodzenia" [Modern Tower Helmets in Silesia – An Attempt to Reinterpret Their Origins]. Quart. The Quarterly of the Institute of Art History at the University of Wrocław (in Polish). 41 (3). Institute of Art History at the University of Wrocław: 3–25.
- MacKie, Gillian (1995). "Symbolism and Purpose in an Early Christian Martyr Chapel: The Case of San Vittore in Ciel D'Oro, Milan". Gesta. 34 (2). The University of Chicago Press on behalf of the International Center of Medieval Art: 91–101. doi:10.2307/767281. JSTOR 767281. S2CID 192545451.
- Magdalino, Paul (1987). "Observations on the Nea Ekklesia of Basil I". Jahrbuch der österreichischen Byzantinistik (Yearbook of Austrian Byzantine Studies). 37. Verlag der Österreichischen Akademie der Wissenschaften (Austrian Academy of Sciences Press): 51–64.
- Magness, Jodi (2005). "Heaven on Earth: Helios and the Zodiac Cycle in Ancient Palestinian Synagogues". Dumbarton Oaks Papers. 59. Dumbarton Oaks, Trustees for Harvard University: 1–52. doi:10.2307/4128749. JSTOR 4128749.
- Magness, Jodi (August 2024), "Jerusalem and Charlemagne", The Ancient Near East Today, vol. 12, no. 8, American Society of Overseas Research
- Mango, Cyril (1991). "Approaches to Byzantine Architecture". Muqarnas. 8, K. A. C. Creswell and His Legacy. Brill: 40–44. doi:10.2307/1523151. JSTOR 1523151.
- Markus, Thomas (December 1999). "What do domes mean?". Critical Quarterly. 41 (4). John Wiley & Sons, Inc.: 3–11. doi:10.1111/1467-8705.00260.
- Marshall, Peter (2009). The Magic Circle of Rudolf II: Alchemy and Astrology in Renaissance Prague. Bloomsbury Publishing USA. ISBN 978-0-802-71857-0.
- Martines, Giangiacomo (2015). "Four - The Conception and Construction of Drum and Dome". In Marder, Tod A.; Jones, Mark Wilson (eds.). The Pantheon: From Antiquity to the Present (PDF). Cambridge, England: Cambridge University Press. pp. 99–131. doi:10.1017/CBO9781139015974.005. ISBN 978-1-139-01597-4.
- Mathews, Thomas F. (Spring 1982). "Cracks in Lehmann's "Dome of Heaven"". Notes in the History of Art. 1 (3). The University of Chicago Press on behalf of the Bard Graduate Center: 12–16. doi:10.1086/sou.1.3.23207826. JSTOR 23207826. S2CID 193035079.
- McParland, Edward (February 1989). "Edward Lovett Pearce and the Parliament House in Dublin". The Burlington Magazine. 131 (1031): 91–100. JSTOR 883752.
- McVey, Kathleen E. (1983). "The Domed Church as Microcosm: Literary Roots of an Architectural Symbol". Dumbarton Oaks Papers. 37. Dumbarton Oaks: 91–121. doi:10.2307/1291479. JSTOR 1291479.
- Melaragno, Michele G. (1991). An Introduction to Shell Structures: the Art and Science of Vaulting (softcover ed.). New York: Van Nostrand Reinhold. ISBN 978-1-4757-0225-5.
- Millon, Henry A. (2005). "Michelangelo to Marchionni, 1546-1784". In Tronzo, William (ed.). St. Peter's in the Vatican (illustrated ed.). Cambridge, England: Cambridge University Press. ISBN 978-0-521-64096-1.
- Mitchell, James H. (1985). "The Noble Dome". The Antioch Review. 43 (3). Antioch Review, Inc.: 261–271. doi:10.2307/4611482. JSTOR 4611482.
- Mohyuddin, Anwaar; Khan, Nasra (2015). "Symbolic Representation of Color Green Among Muslims". IAHRW International Journal of Social Sciences Review. 3 (3). Indian Association of Health, Research and Welfare: 374–378. ISSN 2347-3797.
- Nickel, Lukas (2015), "Bricks in Ancient China and the Question of Early Cross-Asian Interaction", Arts Asiatiques, 70, École française d'Extrême-Orient: 49–62, doi:10.3406/arasi.2015.1883, JSTOR 26358183
- Nuttgens, Patrick (1997). The Story of Architecture. Hong Kong: Phaidon Press Limited. ISBN 978-0-7148-3616-4.
- Ousterhout, Robert G. (2008). Master Builders of Byzantium (paperback ed.). Philadelphia: University of Pennsylvania Museum of Archaeology and Anthropology. ISBN 978-1-934536-03-2.
- Overy, R. J. (2004). The Dictators: Hitler's Germany and Stalin's Russia (illustrated ed.). New York: W.W. Norton & Co. ISBN 978-0-393-02030-4.
- Peterson, Andrew (1996). The Dictionary of Islamic Architecture. Routledge. ISBN 978-0-203-20387-3.
- Piazza, Simone (2020). "Zenith lighting in Christian places of worship between reality and fiction (West-East, 4th-13th centuries)" (PDF). Hortus Artium Medievalium. 26. Brepols: 213–222. doi:10.1484/J.HAM.5.121706.
- Piotrowski, Andrzej (2011), "Architecture and Medieval Modalities of Thought", Architecture of Thought, University of Minnesota Press, pp. 1–32, ISBN 978-0-816-67304-9, JSTOR 10.5749/j.ctttv68r.5
- Rakocija, Miša (2009), "Early christian baptisterium in Mediana, near by Niš", Collection of works from the Symposium "Wаter, Life and Pleasure" in 2008, Strumica, pp. 169–179
- Rizzoni, Giovanni (2009). "The Form of Parliaments & European Identity". In Rorato, Laura; Saunders, Anna (eds.). The Essence and the Margin: National Identities and Collective Memories in Contemporary European Culture. The Netherlands: Rodopi. pp. 183–198. ISBN 978-9-042-02571-4.
- Schindler, Hans (May 1981). "Concerning the Origin of the Onion Dome and Onion Spires in Central European Architecture". Journal of the Society of Architectural Historians. 40 (2): 138–142. doi:10.2307/989727. JSTOR 989727.
- Schutz, Herbert (2004). The Carolingians in Central Europe, Their History, Arts, and Architecture: A Cultural History of Central Europe, 750–900 (illustrated ed.). Brill. ISBN 978-9-00413-149-1.
- Seale, William (1975). "Symbol as Architecture". Design Quarterly (94/95). Walker Art Center: 14–15. doi:10.2307/4090872. JSTOR 4090872.
- Shrimplin, Valerie (May 2025). "Domed Architecture as Image of the Universe". In Farroni, Laura; Incerti, Manuela; Pagliano, Alessandra (eds.). Attraversare il Tempo: Tracce Materiali e Nuove Prospettive [Crossing Time: Material Evidence and Emerging Perspectives] (PDF) (first ed.). Italy: Webster, a division of TXT SpA. pp. 192–205. ISBN 978-88-3359-786-7.
- Smith, Earl Baldwin (1950). The Dome: A Study in the History of Ideas. Princeton, NJ: Princeton University Press. ISSN 0079-5208.
- Smith, Earl Baldwin (1978). Architectural Symbolism of Imperial Rome and the Middle Ages (illustrated, reprint, reissue, revised ed.). New York: Hacker Art Books. ISBN 978-0-878-17195-8.
- Stalley, Roger A. (1999). Early Medieval Architecture (illustrated ed.). Oxford: Oxford University Press. ISBN 978-0-192-84223-7.
- Stanković, Nebojša P. (2024). "Royal Canopy over the Church Entrance: Forms, Spatial Contexts, Iconographic Programs, and Meaning of the Dome in Serbian Narthexes of the 14th Century". Зборник Радова Филозофског Факултета У Приштини. 54 (3). Универзитет у Приштини: 309–347. doi:10.5937/zrffp54-53038.
- Stephenson, Davis; Hammond, Victoria; Davi, Keith F. (2005). Visions of Heaven: the Dome in European Architecture (illustrated ed.). Princeton Architectural Press. ISBN 978-1-56898-549-7.
- Stewart, Charles Anthony (2008). Domes of Heaven: The Domed Basilicas of Cyprus (illustrated ed.). ProQuest LLC. ISBN 978-0-549-75556-2.
- Swoboda, Karl M. (May 1961). "The Problem of the Iconography of Late Antique and Early Mediaeval Palaces". Journal of the Society of Architectural Historians. 20 (2). Berkeley: University of California Press: 78–89. doi:10.2307/988105. JSTOR 988105.
- Tabbaa, Yasser (1985). "The Muqarnas Dome: Its Origin and Meaning". Muqarnas. 3. Brill: 61–74. doi:10.2307/1523084. JSTOR 1523084.
- Tabbaa, Yasser (2008). "Andalusian Roots and Abbasid Homage in the Qubbat Al-Barudiyyin in Marrakech". Muqarnas. 25. Brill: 133–146. doi:10.1163/22118993-90000128. JSTOR 27811116.
- Tampone, Gennaro (2012), "On the Origins of the Dome" (PDF), Proceedings of the International Congress on Domes in the World, Florence, Florence, Italy: Nardini Editore, pp. 7–14
- Temple, Nicholas (May 2002), "Conversion and Political Expedience: Imperial Themes in the Early Christian Baptistery", Anales del Instituto de Investigaciones Estéticas, 24 (80): 5–45, doi:10.22201/iie.18703062e.2002.80.2105
- Thomas, Edmund (2007). Monumentality and the Roman Empire: Architecture in the Antonine Age. Oxford, England: Oxford University Press. ISBN 978-0-19-155843-6.
- Tresidder, Jack (2005). The Complete Dictionary of Symbols. Vancouver, B.C.: Chronicle Books. p. 544. ISBN 978-0-811-84767-4.
- Wallis, Kendall (2010). "Bearing Bandmann's Meaning: A Translator's Introduction by Kendall Wallis". In Bandmann, Günter (ed.). Early Medieval Architecture as Bearer of Meaning. Translated by Kendall Wallis. Columbia University Press. ISBN 978-0-231-50172-9.
- Wallis, Miecyzslaw (1973), "Semantic and Symbolic Elements in Architecture: Iconology as a First Step Towards an Architectural Semiotic", Semiotica, 8 (3): 220–238, doi:10.1515/semi.1973.8.3.220, S2CID 170982518
- Walter, Michael L. (2009). Buddhism and Empire: The Political and Religious Culture of Early Tibet. Volume 22 of Brill's Tibetan Studies Library. Leiden, The Netherlands: Brill. p. 311. ISBN 978-9-004-17584-6.
- Westbrook, Nigel (2006). "Architecture of Traces and Ascriptions: Interpreting the Vanished Great Palace of the Byzantine Emperors in Constantinople". Fabrications. 16 (1). Taylor & Francis: 43–61. doi:10.1080/10331867.2006.10539579.
- Wittkower, Rudolf (1971). Architectural Principles in the Age of Humanism (illustrated, reprint ed.). New York: W.W. Norton & Co. p. 173. ISBN 978-0-393-00599-8.
- Wittkower, Rudolf (1989). "S. Maria della Salute: Scenographic Architecture and the Venetian Baroque". In Kleinbauer, W. Eugene (ed.). Modern Perspectives in Western Art History: An Anthology of Twentieth-century Writings on the Visual Arts (illustrated, reprint, reissue ed.). University of Toronto Press. pp. 165–192. ISBN 978-0-802-06708-1.
