= Irma B. Jaffe =

American art historian (1917–2018)

- Born: Irma Blumenthal Levy; 1917; New Orleans, Louisiana, U.S.
- Died: January 3, 2018 (aged 100–101); New York City, New York, U.S.
- Burial place: Mount Ararat Cemetery, East Farmingdale, New York, U.S.
- Other names: Irma Blumenthal; Irma Korshak
- Education: University of Illinois Chicago, Columbia University (BA, MA, PhD)
- Occupations: Art historian, research curator, educator
- Spouse(s): Donald Korshak (m. 1935–?), Samuel B. Jaffe (m. 1941–1987; his death)
- Children: 1

Irma Blumenthal Jaffe (née Irma Blumenthal Levy; 1917 – January 3, 2018) was an American art historian, research curator, writer and educator. Jaffe was the founder and chairman of the Department of Fine Arts at Fordham University in New York City. Additionally she was a narrator and screen writer of a public television show. Jaffe wrote about Italian and American art history.

== Early life and education ==
Irma Blumenthal Levy was born on 1917, in New Orleans, Louisiana. Her parents were Estelle (née Levy) and Harry Blumenthal. She attended the University of Illinois Chicago, starting at age 17, but the following year she left school to marry Donald Korshak in 1935.

She returned to schooling in 1954 at Columbia University School of General Studies, and graduated in 1958 with magna cum laude honors. She continued at Columbia University, graduating in 1960 with a M.A. degree, and in 1966 with a PhD. Her dissertation was on the painter Joseph Stella.

In June 1941, she married Samuel B. Jaffe of New York City at the Belmont Hotel.

== Career ==
While pursuing her Ph.D. in 1964, Jaffe was appointed research curator at the Whitney Museum of American Art in New York City. She left the Whitney Museum to join Fordham University. She was the founder and chairman of the Department of Fine Arts at Fordham University, where she remained until her retirement. Jaffe and Baroque scholar Rudolf Wittkower launched a symposium "Baroque Art: the Jesuit Contribution" during her time at Fordham University.

In 1971, Jaffe identified some of the subjects of a John Trumbull painting, The Declaration of Independence (1818), based on research and comparing with his earlier drawings.

Jaffe was the writer and narrator of a television series called Project Now: Introduction to Art History, airing in 1969 to 1970, on WABC-TV New York City.

She published books on artists Giovanni Battista Zelotti, Leonard Baskin, John Trumbull, and Joseph Stella.

== Death ==
She died at age 101 on January 3, 2018, in her home in New York City.

Her daughter Yvonne Korshak is an art historian.

== Publications ==
=== Books ===
- Jaffe, Irma B. (1970). Joseph Stella. Harvard University Press. ISBN 978-0783741123.
- Jaffe, Irma B. (1975). John Trumbull, Patriot–Artist of the American Revolution. New York Graphic Society. ISBN 978-0821204597.
- Jaffe, Irma B. (1980). The Sculpture of Leonard Baskin. Viking Studio. ISBN 978-0670625260.
- Jaffe, Irma B.; Columbardo, Gernando (2002). Shining Eyes, Cruel Fortune: The Lives and Loves of Italian Renaissance Women Poets. Fordham University Press. ISBN 978-0823221806.

=== Articles ===
- Jaffe, Irma B.; Brown, Milton W. (September 1964). "The Story of the Armory Show". The Art Bulletin. 46 (3): 420. doi:10.2307/3048200. ISSN 0004-3079. JSTOR 3048200.
- Jaffe, Irma B. (November 6, 1989). "Paintings of Biblical Proportion". Christian Science Monitor.
- Jaffe, Irma B. (1993). "The Tell-Tale Tail of a Parrot: Dürer's "Adam and Eve"". The Print Collector's Newsletter. 24 (2): 52–53. ISSN 0032-8537. JSTOR 24555357.
