= Werner Joseph Wittkower =

German-Israeli architect (1903–1997)

- וורנר יוסף ויטקובר
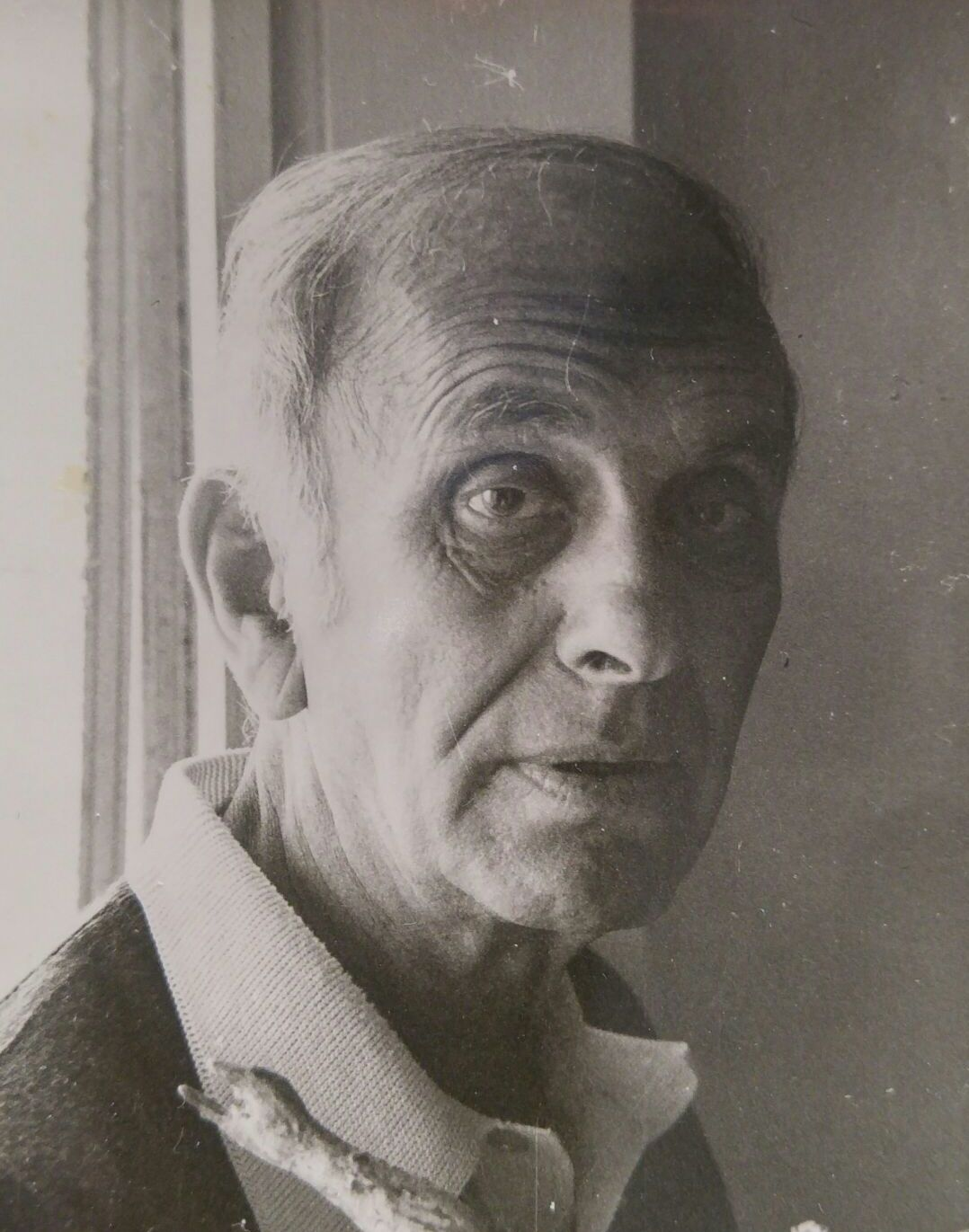
- Werner Joseph Wittkower, circa 1976
- Born: 12 May 1903; Berlin, Germany
- Died: 11 December 1997 (aged 96); Tel Aviv, Israel
- Occupation: Architect

Werner Joseph Wittkower (Hebrew: וורנר יוסף ויטקובר; May 12, 1903, Berlin; December 11, 1997, Tel Aviv), was a German-Israeli architect.

== Family ==
His parents were Henry Wittkower (1865–1942) and Gertrude Ansbach (Wittkower) (1876–1965). His siblings were art historian Rudolf Wittkower (1901–1971), Kate Wittkower (1900–1968), and Elly Friedmann (1912–1988).

== Career ==
Wittkower studied art history and archeology at the universities of Berlin and Heidelberg. In 1931 he began working as an architect in Berlin. After the Nazi party took power in 1933, he emigrated to Palestine. After working for the British army as a civilian during World War Two, he became a successful architect in the state of Israel. He was a member of the Tel Aviv planning committee (1946–1954), and he designed many buildings in Tel Aviv.

== Selected publications ==
- Städtebau- und Wohnungsbaubestimmungen in Erez Israel, in: Journal of the Association of Engineers & Architects, Tel Aviv, October 1943.
- Climate-adapted Building in Israel. How far has our knowledge influenced Building Practice?, in: Energy and Buildings 7, The Netherlands, 1984
