= Margot Wittkower =

German-born American designer and art historian (1902–1995)

- Born: Margot Holzmann; August 28, 1902
- Died: July 3, 1995 (aged 92); New York City, New York, U.S.
- Occupations: Art historian, interior designer
- Spouse: Rudolf Wittkower (m. 1923)

Margot Wittkower (née Margot Holzmann; August 28, 1902 – July 3, 1995), was a German-born American interior designer and art historian specializing in neo-Palladian architecture and Italian Renaissance and Baroque period.

== Life and work ==
Born August 28, 1902, as Margot Holzmann in Berlin, Germany. She was primarily an artist but later established herself as an interior designer. She met her future husband Rudolf Wittkower when she was just age 16 however they waited until 1923 to marry, due to their young ages.

Her spouse Rudolf began teaching at Cologne University in 1932, but because they were Jewish, they was forced to leave Germany due to Nazi control.

In 1933 the couple moved to London. Margot specialized in apartment interiors and furniture design at this time and both husband and wife were drawn to neo-Palladian architecture. Starting around the mid-1950s she co-authored various books with her husband, many of which are significant today in the area of Italian Art History. Together they documented in their writings the change from craftsmen to artist during the Renaissance.

She died at age 93 at her home in Manhattan.

== Publications ==
- Gian Lorenzo Bernini: The Sculptor of the Roman Baroque (1955, co-authored with Rudolf Wittkower, Howard Hibbard, Thomas Martin)
- Born Under Saturn: The Character and Conduct of Artists: Documented History from Antiquity to the French Revolution (1963, co-authored with Rudolf Wittkower)
- Divine Michelangelo: The Florentine Academy's Homage on His Death in 1564 (1964, co-authored with Rudolf Wittkower)
- Sculpture: Processes and Principles (1977, co-authored with Rudolf Wittkower)
- Congress: Process and Policy (1978, co-authored with Randall B. Ripley)
- Selected Lectures of Rudolf Wittkower: The Impact of Non-European Civilization on the Art of the West (1989, co-authored with Rudolf Wittkower, Donald Martin Reynolds)
- Partnership and discovery, Margot and Rudolf Wittkower (1994)
