= Rudolf Wittkower =

British art historian (1901–1971)

- Rudolf Wittkower, 1967
- Born: 22 June 1901; Berlin, Germany
- Died: 11 October 1971 (aged 70); New York City, New York, U.S.
- Occupations: Art historian, academic
- Spouse: Margot Holzmann (m. 1923)
- Relatives: Werner Joseph Wittkower (brother)

Rudolf Wittkower (22 June 1901 – 11 October 1971) was a German art historian specializing in Italian Renaissance and Baroque art and architecture, who spent much of his career in London, but was educated in Germany, and later moved to the United States. Despite having a British father who stayed in Germany after his studies, he was born and raised in Berlin.

== Early life ==
Wittkower was born in Berlin, Germany to parents Henry Wittkower (1865–1942) and Gertrude Ansbach (Wittkower) (1876–1965). His siblings were Kate Wittkower (1900–1968), Werner Joseph Wittkower (1903–1997), and Elly Friedmann (1912–1988).

== Career ==
Rudolf Wittkower moved to London in 1933 with his wife Margot (née Holzmann) because they were both Jewish and were fleeing Nazi Germany. He taught at the Warburg Institute, University of London from 1934 to 1956, was appointed Durning Lawrence professor at the Slade School of Fine Art, University College, London in 1949.

He then moved to the United States to work at Columbia University from 1956 to 1969 where he was chairman of the Department of Art History and Archaeology. Wittkower and American art historian Irma B. Jaffe launched a symposium "Baroque Art: the Jesuit Contribution".

Among Wittkower's books were monographs on Bernini and Michelangelo, volumes in standard textbook series, and more individual subjects such as his Architectural Principles in the Age of Humanism, "his most significant book". This introduced an in depth analysis of the Venetian architect Andrea Palladio and his relation to sixteenth century music theory. Part Four specifically deals with how and why Palladio adapted harmonic musical ratios and incorporated them into the physical proportions of his buildings. Although this theory of Palladian proportions was universally accepted after the book's release, recent works in art history have made it the subject of much controversy. Wittkower had encountered this notion that musical harmony may act in a manner analogous to visual harmony in Pythagoras, where it was also noted by Alberti.

Wittkower was elected to the American Academy of Arts and Sciences in 1959 and the American Philosophical Society in 1971. He was awarded the Alice Davis Hitchcock Award posthumously in 1975 for his book Gothic vs. Classic, Architectural Projects in Seventeenth-Century Italy.

Wittkower died on 11 October 1971.

== Publications ==
- Architectural Principles in the Age of Humanism (1949)
- Bernini: The Sculptor of the Roman Baroque (1955)
- The Arts in Western Europe: Italy in New Cambridge Modern History, vol. 1 (1957), pp. 127–53
- Art and Architecture in Italy, 1600–1750 (Pelican History of Art, 1958, and revised editions)
- Born Under Saturn: The Character and Conduct of Artists (1963, co-authored with Margot Wittkower)
- The Divine Michelangelo (1964, co-authored with Margot Wittkower)
- Gothic vs. Classic, Architectural Projects in Seventeenth-Century Italy (1974)
- Sculpture: Processes and Principles (1977, co-authored with Margot Wittkower)

== Bibliography ==
=== General references ===
1. Rosand, David (Fall 2003). "Making Art History at Columbia: Meyer Schapiro and Rudolf Wittkower". Columbia Magazine. Manhattan: Columbia University. ISSN 0162-3893.
  1. Preprinted: Rosand, David (2006). "Making Art History at Columbia: Meyer Schapiro and Rudolf Wittkower". In De Bary, Wm. Theodore (ed.). Living Legacies at Columbia. Manhattan: Columbia University Press. pp. 117–129. ISBN 0-2311-3884-9. LCCN 2006000033. OCLC 62804985 – via Google Books.
2. David Rosand. "Making Art History at Columbia: Meyer Schapiro and Rudolf Wittkower". Columbia Magazine.
3. Howard, Deborah. "Four Centuries of Literature on Palladio", Journal of the Society of Architectural Historians, Vol. 39, No. 3 (October 1980), 224–241.
