= Chrysotriklinos =

Hall of the Great Palace of Constantinople

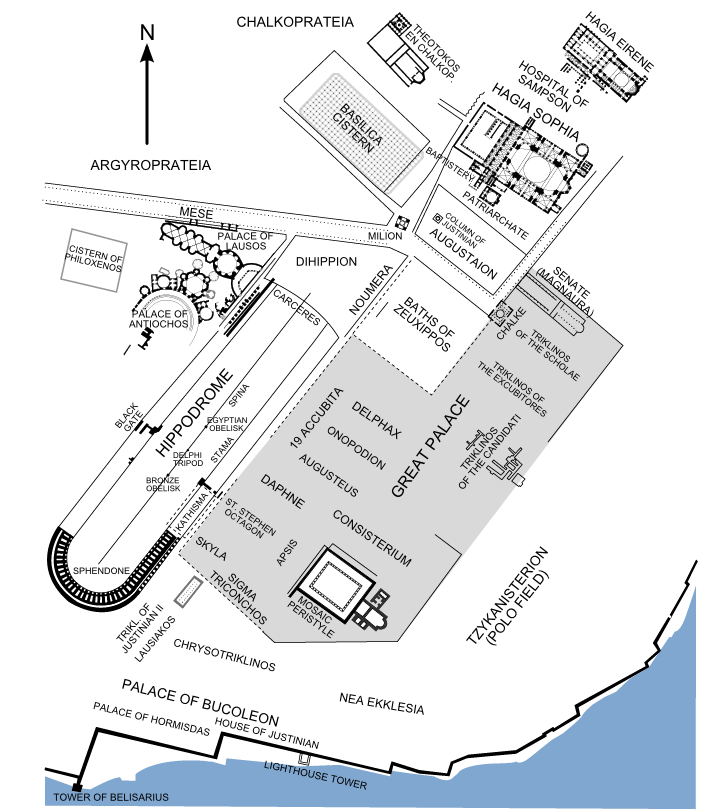
Map of the Great Palace and its surroundings. The approximate location of the Chrysotriklinos is shown in the south, near the seaside Boukoleon Palace and the Pharos light tower.

The Chrysotriklinos (Greek: Χρυσοτρίκλινος, "golden reception hall", cf. triclinium), Latinized as Chrysotriclinus or Chrysotriclinium, was the main reception and ceremonial hall of the Great Palace of Constantinople from its construction, in the late 6th century, until the 10th century. Its appearance is known only through literary descriptions, chiefly the 10th-century De Ceremoniis, a collection of imperial ceremonies, but, as the chief symbol of imperial power, it inspired the construction of Charlemagne's Palatine Chapel in Aachen.

== History and functions ==
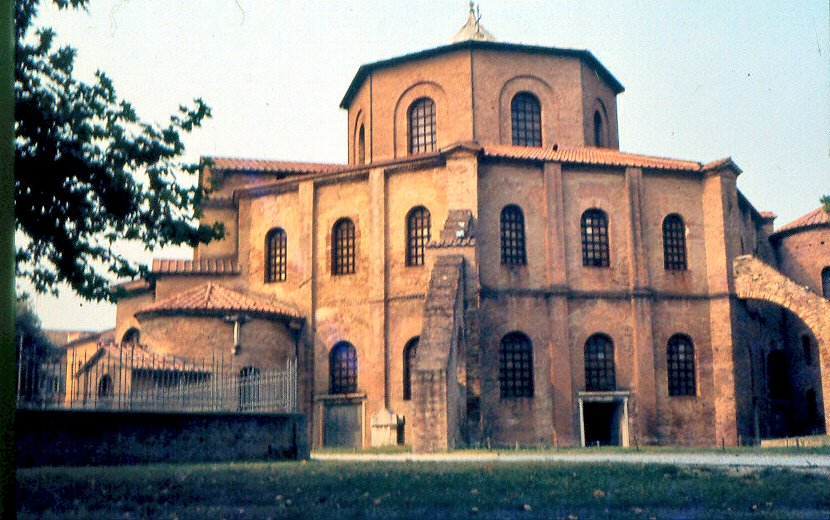
The Basilica of San Vitale in Ravenna. Its layout was similar to that of the Chrysotriklinos.

The hall is usually attributed to Emperor Justin II (r. 565–578), with his successor, Tiberius II (r. 578–582) finishing it and carrying out its decoration. However, Byzantine sources present conflicting accounts: the Suda encyclopedia attributes the building to Justin I (r. 518–527), and the Patria of Constantinople to the Emperor Marcian (r. 450–457), although the latter is usually rejected as unreliable. The historian Joannes Zonaras records that Justin II in fact reconstructed an earlier building, which has been suggested as the Heptaconch Hall of Justinian I (r. 527–565).

Following the Byzantine Iconoclasm, it was embellished again under the emperors Michael III (r. 842–867) and Basil I (r. 866–886). Unlike the earlier, single-purpose buildings of the Daphne wing of the Great Palace, it combined the functions of throne room for reception and audiences with those of a banquet hall. Theophanes Continuatus states that Constantine VII installed silver doors. Since the later imperial chambers were also attached to it, the hall acquired a central position in the everyday palace ceremonial, especially in the 9th and 10th centuries, to the point that Constantine VII Porphyrogennetos (r. 945–959) calls it simply "the palace". In particular, according to the De Ceremoniis, the Chrysotriklinos served for the reception of foreign embassies, the ceremonial conferring of dignities, as an assembly point for religious festivals and a banquet hall for special feasts, like Easter.

The Chrysotriklinos thus became the central part of the new Boukoleon Palace, formed when Emperor Nikephoros II (r. 963–969) enclosed the southern, seaward part of the Great Palace with a wall. From the late 11th century however, the Byzantine emperors began to prefer the Blachernae Palace, in the northwestern corner of the city, as their residence. The Latin emperors (1204–1261) chiefly used the Boukoleon, and so did, for a time after the recovery of the city in 1261, Michael VIII Palaiologos (r. 1259–1282) while the Blachernae Palace was being restored. Subsequently, the Great Palace was rarely used and gradually fell into decay. The Chrysotriklinos is mentioned for the last time in 1308, although the still-impressive ruins of the Great Palace remained in place until the end of the Byzantine Empire.

== Description ==
Despite its prominence and frequent mention in Byzantine texts, no full description of the Chrysotriklinos is ever given. From the fragmented literary evidence, the hall appears to have been of octagonal shape crowned by a dome, paralleling other 6th-century buildings like the Church of Sergius and Bacchus in Constantinople and the Basilica of San Vitale in Ravenna. The roof was pierced by 16 windows and supported by 8 arches, which formed kamarai (apses or niches). The shape and general features of the Chrysotriklinos were later consciously imitated by Charlemagne in the construction of the Palatine Chapel of the Palace of Aachen, although San Vitale, being located within his realm, provided the immediate architectural model.

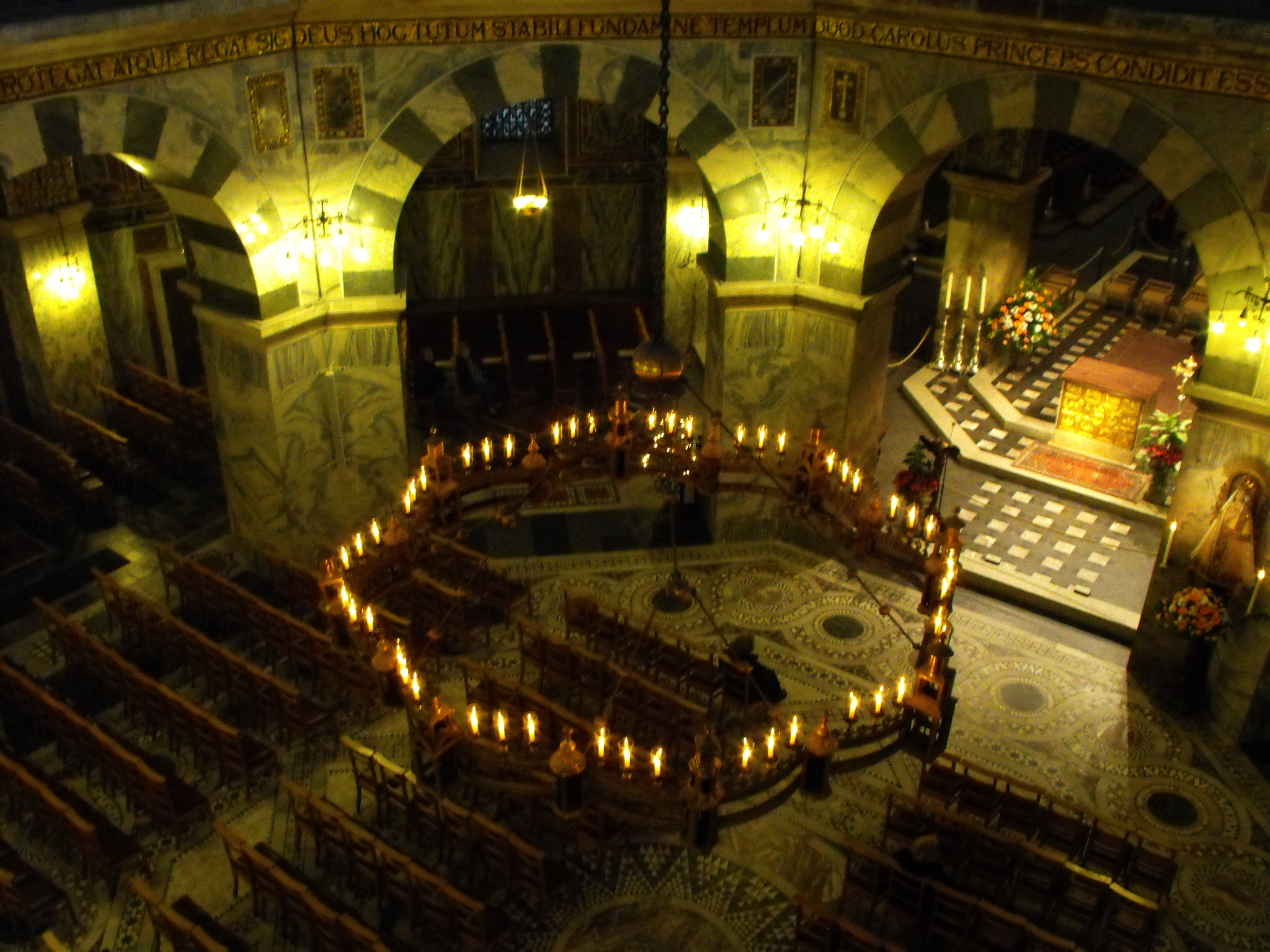
Interior of the octagonal Palatine Chapel in Aachen, which was modelled on the Chrysotriklinos.

In its interior, the imperial throne was placed on the eastern apse (the bēma), behind a bronze railing. The northeastern apse was known as the "oratory of St Theodore". It contained the emperor's crown and a number of holy relics, including the rod of Moses, and also served as a dressing room for the emperor. The southern apse led to the imperial bedroom (koitōn), through a silver door put in place by Emperor Constantine VII. The northern apse was known as the Pantheon, a waiting-room for officials, while the northwestern apse, the Diaitarikion, served as a steward's room, and was where the papias of the palace deposed his keys, the symbol of his office, after the ceremonial opening of the hall each morning. The main hall of the Chrysotriklinos was surrounded by a number of annexes and halls: the vestibule known as Tripeton, the Horologion (so named because it probably contained a sundial), the hall of the Kainourgion ("New [Hall]"), and the halls of the Lausiakos and the Justinianos, both attributed to Justinian II (r. 685–695 and 705–711). The Theotokos of the Pharos, the main palace chapel, was also located nearby, to the south or south-east.

Nothing is known of the hall's original, 6th-century decoration. There was most likely an image of the enthroned Christ, which would have been destroyed around 730, during the era of Byzantine Iconoclasm. Sometime between 856 and 866, after the iconoclasts fell from power, the hall was redecorated with mosaics in a monumental style.

In addiction to the De Ceremoniis, what is known about the 9th century decoration comes from an inscription that was found inside the hall and transcribed in the Greek Anthology 1.106. The inscription is dated by Cyril Mango between 856 and 866, due to the fact that neither Empress Theodora (r. 842–56; expelled in 856) nor Basil I (crowned co-emperor in 866 and ruled alone from 867 to 886) are mentioned. The inscription describes the triumph of Orthodoxy over Iconoclasm and the decoration of the room. The text describes how above the imperial throne was an image of Christ enthroned, while an image over the entrance depicted the Virgin Mary, with images of the Emperor and the Patriarch nearby. Christ was most likely seated on a "lyre-backed" throne, the same image seen in imperial coins and other Byzantine mosaics. The emperor can be identified as Michael III, while the identity of the Patriarch is uncertain; most scholars identify him as Photios, but some prefer Methodios. Elsewhere were depicted angels, priests, apostles and martyrs. The overall decoration was intended to reinforce the analogy between Christ's heavenly court and its Byzantine counterpart on earth, and the parallelism between the enthroned Christ and the enthroned Emperor, who was his representative. The late 10th-century ambassador Liutprand of Cremona does not hesitate to call it "the finest room in the palace". Theophanes Continuatus describes the intricate mosaics and decorations that imitated fresh flowers and floral motifs. He also writes of a silver antux (probably a cornice) that went around the interior of the building, and states that it was installed by Constantine VII.

An elaborate system of ornamented curtains was used to separate spaces, ceremonial, and direct the movement of courtiers and processionals.

The hall contained valuable furniture, such as the Pentapyrgion ("Five Towers"), a cupboard built by Emperor Theophilos (r. 829–842) that displayed precious vases, crowns and other valuable objects. During imperial banquets, it featured a gilded principal table for thirty high-ranking dignitaries, as well as two to four additional tables for 18 persons each. On occasion, the emperor is described as having his own table, set apart from the rest. The full ceremonial splendor of the hall was reserved for special occasions, such as the banquets for Arab envoys, described in the De Ceremoniis: additional lightning was provided by great chandeliers, imperial regalia, relics and other precious items were brought from various churches and displayed in the apses, while the meal was accompanied by music from two silver and two golden organs, placed in the porch, as well as by the choirs of the Hagia Sophia and the Holy Apostles.

== See also ==
- Ancient Roman and Byzantine domes
- Symbolism of domes

== Sources ==
- Cormack, Robin (2007). "But is it Art?". In Hoffman, Eva Rose F. (ed.). Late antique and medieval art of the Mediterranean world. Wiley-Blackwell. pp. 301–314. ISBN 978-1-4051-2071-5.
- Fichtenau, Heinrich (1978). The Carolingian empire. University of Toronto Press. ISBN 978-0-8020-6367-0.
- Kazhdan, Alexander, ed. (1991). The Oxford Dictionary of Byzantium. Oxford and New York: Oxford University Press. ISBN 0-19-504652-8.
- Kostenec, Jan (2008-04-06). "Chrysotriklinos". Encyclopedia of the Hellenic World, Constantinople.
- Featherstone, John (2005). ‘The Chrysotriklinos seen through De ceremoniis’, in L. M. Hoffmann (ed.), Zwischen Polis, Provinz und Peripherie (Wiesbaden, 2005) 845-852
- Featherstone, John (2006). The Great Palace as Reflected in the De Ceremoniis’, in Bauer (ed.), Visualisierungen von Herrschaft, Byzas 5 (2006) 47–61.
- Mango, Cyril A. (1986). The Art of the Byzantine Empire 312-1453: Sources and Documents. University of Toronto Press. ISBN 978-0-8020-6627-5.
