= Ellen Rosand =

Ellen Rosand (born 28 February 1940) is an American musicologist, historian, and opera critic who specializes in Italian music and poetry of the 16th through 18th centuries. Her work has been particularly focused on the music and culture of Venice and Italian opera of the baroque era. She is an acknowledged expert on the operas of Handel and Vivaldi, and on Venetian opera. Her books include Opera in Seventeenth-Century Venice: The Creation of a Genre (1991, University of California Press) and Monteverdi's last operas: a Venetian trilogy (2007, University of California Press). She has also contributed articles to numerous publications, including The New Grove Dictionary of Music and Musicians.

Rosand is a graduate of Vassar College (A.B., 1961), Harvard University (M.A., 1964), and New York University (Ph.D., 1971). From 1981 to 1983 she was editor of the Journal of the American Musicological Society. From 1992 to 1994 she was President of the American Musicological Society, and from 1997 to 2002 she was Vice-president of the International Musicological Society. In 1990 she was awarded a Guggenheim Fellowship and in 2007 she was the recipient of the Andrew W. Mellon Foundation Distinguished Achievement Award. She currently serves on the editorial boards of several publications, including The Journal of Musicology, The Cambridge Opera Journal, Journal of the Royal Musical Association and Cambridge Studies in Opera. She has taught on the music faculty at Yale University since 1992, including serving as department chair of the music department from 1993 to 1998. She had previously taught on the faculty at Rutgers University.

She was married for 53 years to the art historian David Rosand, until he died in 2014. They had two sons, one of whom is Jonathan Rosand, Professor of Neurology at Harvard Medical School.
