= Jonathan Rosand =

Professor of Neurology at Harvard Medical School

- Born: New York, New York, U.S.
- Education: Columbia University; Columbia University College of Physicians & Surgeons
- Scientific career
- Workplaces: Massachusetts General Hospital; Harvard Medical School; Broad Institute of MIT and Harvard

Jonathan Rosand is an American neurologist, clinician-scientist and Professor of Neurology at Harvard Medical School. He is Chief of the Division of Neurocritical Care and Emergency Neurology, Medical Director of the Neurosciences Intensive Care Unit and holds the J.P. Kistler Endowed Chair in Neurology at the Massachusetts General Hospital (MGH). He is also Independent Faculty within the MGH Center for Human Genetic Research and an Associate Member of the Broad Institute of MIT and Harvard. He previously was Program Director for the Massachusetts General Hospital/Brigham and Women's Hospital/Harvard Medical School Fellowship Training Programs in both Neurocritical Care and Vascular Neurology. He is the founder of the International Stroke Genetics Consortium and was its inaugural steering committee chair.

== Early life and education ==
Rosand was born in New York, New York, to art historian David Rosand and musicologist Ellen Rosand. Rosand earned his bachelor of arts in Greek and Latin from Columbia University and his MD from the Columbia University College of Physicians and Surgeons. He completed his residency training at MGH, as Chief Resident in Neurology, followed by a fellowship in vascular neurology and neurocritical care, also at MGH.

== Research ==
Rosand's research focuses on stroke, brain hemorrhage and brain injury and the application of human genetic variation to reducing their impact.

== Awards and honors ==
Rosand's awards include election as Fellow of the American Neurological Association, the American Heart Association, and the Neurocritical Care Society. He was the Annual Distinguished Lecturer at the University of Edinburgh’s Neuroscience Day in 2014. He is on the Advisory Council of the Department of Art History and Archaeology, Columbia University.
