= Palace of Daphne =

Coordinates: 41.006°N 28.976°E

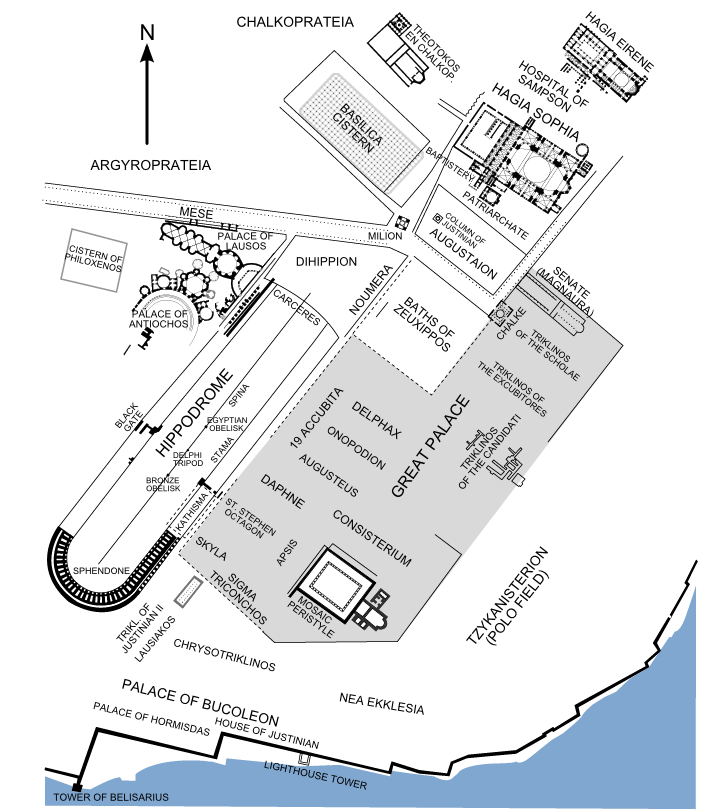
Plan of the imperial palace precinct of Constantinople.

The Palace of Daphne (Greek: Δάφνη, Dáphnē, lit. 'laurel) was one of the major wings of the Great Palace of Constantinople, the capital of the Byzantine Empire (modern Istanbul, Turkey). According to George Codinus, it was named after a statue of the nymph Daphne, brought from Rome. The exact layout and appearance of the palace is unclear, since it lies under the Sultan Ahmed Mosque, and the only surviving evidence comes from literary sources. Jonathan Bardill, however, has suggested that the peristyle with mosaics adjoining an apsed hall, excavated by the Walker Trust excavations in 1935-7 and 1952-4, could be the Augusteus of the Daphne Palace.

== History and description ==
The Daphne belonged to the earliest building phase of the palace complex, that of Constantine I, who rebuilt the city of Byzantium into Constantinople, his new capital, as well as his immediate successors. Justin II (r. 565–568) expanded the original building, which remained the main residential area for the emperors until the 8th century. The palace was formed by an ensemble of ceremonial halls and residential buildings, located in the westernmost part of the imperial palace complex, next to the Hippodrome, and was connected to the imperial box (the kathisma) there by a stairway. This complex included the residential wing of the koitōn ("bedchamber") of the Daphne proper, the Octagon, and the chapel of St Stephen, built in ca. 421, the Augusta Pulcheria to house the right arm of the saint. The Daphne was connected to the hall (triklinos) of the Augusteus (Greek: Αὐγουστεύς, not to be confused with the Augustaion square), also one of the oldest parts of the imperial palace. It was also known under the name Stepsimon (Στέψιμον, "coronation"), highlighting its function the original coronation hall of the palace, a role it retained (especially for the coronations of empresses and imperial weddings) to a degree into the middle Byzantine period. In turn, the Augusteus was connected to the later Trikonchos palace and the hall of the Consistorium. Two further chapels, dedicated to the Virgin Mary and the Holy Trinity, were also located in the southern part of the Daphne complex.

In the 9th-10th centuries, the center of court life and ceremonial was moved to the south, towards the Boukoleon Palace and the ceremonial structures around the Chrysotriklinos. Although the Daphne continued to feature in imperial ceremonies however, as described in the De Ceremoniis by Constantine Porphyrogennetos, its decline in prestige and use is well illustrated by the fact that the walls by which Emperor Nikephoros II Phokas (r. 963–969) surrounded the palace with new walls, the Daphne complex was not included in them. After the 11th century, the Daphne seems to have fallen into disrepair and gradual ruin, a process exacerbated by the plundering of the remaining structures for metals and architectural elements under the Latin Empire (1204–1261).

== Sources ==
- Kazhdan, Alexander, ed. (1991). The Oxford Dictionary of Byzantium. Oxford and New York: Oxford University Press. ISBN 0-19-504652-8.
- Maguire, Henry (2004). Byzantine court culture from 829 to 1204. Dumbarton Oaks. ISBN 978-0-88402-308-1.
- Paspates, A. G. (2004) [1893]. The Great Palace of Constantinople. Kessinger Publishing. ISBN 0-7661-9617-8.
- Westbrook, Nigel (2007-12-21). "Great Palace in Constantinople". Encyclopedia of the Hellenic World, Constantinople. Archived from the original on 2015-05-10.
