= David Rosand =

American art historian

David Rosand (September 6, 1938 – August 8, 2014) was an American art historian, university professor and writer. He died on August 8, 2014, from cardiac amyloidosis. Rosand specialized in Italian Renaissance art, and was known for his scholarly work on Venice and Venetian artists, in particular Titian.

== Education and early life ==
Rosand was born in Brooklyn; and graduated from Brooklyn Technical High School. He attended Columbia College where he was an editor and cartoonist for the Jester. He received his undergraduate degree from Columbia University in 1959.

In 1961, he married Vassar graduate Ellen Fineman, better known as the distinguished musicologist Ellen Rosand.

Columbia awarded Rosand his PhD in 1965. His dissertation was supported in part by a Fulbright scholarship for study in Italy.

== Honors and awards ==
- 1961 — Fulbright fellowship for the study of the Renaissance in Venice.
- 1974 — Guggenheim fellowship for the study of "pictorial structure and narrative mode in Venetian paintings of the Renaissance."
- 1997 — Great Teacher Award from the Society of Columbia Graduates.
- 2007 — Renaissance Society of America, Paul Oskar Kristeller Award for Lifetime Achievement

== Career ==
Rosand began teaching at Columbia in 1964, becoming the Meyer Schapiro Professor of Art History until his retirement when he was named professor emeritus.

Rosand was honored at a one-day symposium at Columbia University in October 2008. The event brought together Professor Rosand's colleagues and former graduate students to present research and personal reflections on the occasion of his seventieth birthday and retirement. The symposium was organized around papers on a wide variety of topics related to Professor Rosand's past and current research.

Complementing his career as an academic, he served on the Art Advisory Council of the International Foundation for Art Research (IFAR) and was a board member of Save Venice Inc.

== Personal life and family ==
In 2014, he died at the age of 75 in Manhattan, New York. He was married for 53 years to musicologist Ellen Rosand and is survived by two sons, including Jonathan Rosand, Professor of Neurology at Harvard Medical School.

== Selected works ==
In a statistical overview derived from writings by and about David Rosand, OCLC/WorldCat encompasses roughly 80+ works in 170+ publications in 8 languages and 9,000+ library holdings.

- Titian and the Venetian Woodcut (1976)
- Titian, New York: Harry N. Abrams (1978); a lavishly illustrated adaptation into French:
  - Titien : « L’art plus fort que la nature », coll. « Découvertes Gallimard » (nº 169), série Arts. Paris: Éditions Gallimard (1993; translated by Jeanne Bouniort)
    - Tiziano: “l’arte più potente della natura”, coll. «Universale Electa/Gallimard» (nº 25), serie Arte. Trieste: Electa/Gallimard (1993; translated by Maurizio Vitta)
- Painting in Sixteenth-Century Venice: Titian, Veronese, and Tintoretto (1st ed., 1982 [Yale]; rev. ed., 1997 [Cambridge])
- Robert Motherwell on Paper: Drawings, Prints, Collages (1997)
- The Meaning of the Mark: Leonardo and Titian (1988)
- The Myths of Venice: The Figuration of a State (2001)
- Drawing Acts: Studies in Graphic Expression and Representation (2002)
- The Invention of Painting in America (2004)
- "Veronese's Magdalene and Pietro Aretino," The Burlington Magazine 153 (2011)
- Véronese (2012)
