= Eunuchs in the Byzantine Empire =

Eunuchs (in Greek οἱ εὐνοῦχοι) were an extremely important and numerous category of courtiers of the Byzantine Emperor. Their main purpose was to serve the emperor and empress in the chambers of the Great Palace; only they could be fully trusted by the emperor. Because of their unfettered access to the emperor's person, the eunuchs, who had their own court hierarchy, controlled the administration of the state for most of Byzantine history.

Eunuchs were highly privileged in Byzantine society. Although they could not occupy the imperial throne and their legal rights were limited in some respects, eunuchs otherwise had very attractive prospects. Although the main source of eunuchs in Byzantium was slaves from neighboring countries, it was not uncommon for the younger sons of noble families to be castrated. For example, two of the sons of Emperor Romanos I Lekapenos were castrated — Theophylact, who later became Patriarch, and Basil, the de facto ruler of the empire in 945-985. In general, eunuchs had the opportunity to excel in any professional field. Beginning in the 6th century, eunuchs held high positions at the head of the Byzantine army and navy, although they rarely achieved success in this field.

Eunuchs were much rarer in the lower ranks of society.

== Legal status ==
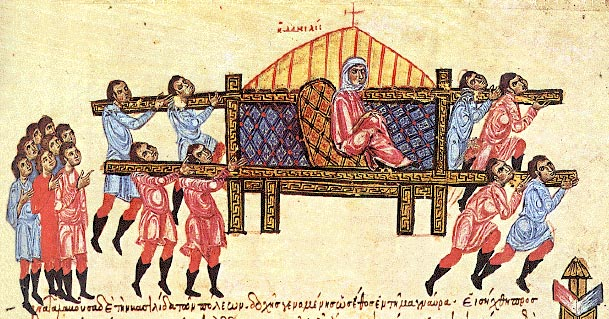
The arrival around 881 of the wealthy widow Danielis in Constantinople with gifts for Emperor Basil I, of which the most valuable were 100 eunuchs, made a strong impression on contemporaries.

Historically, the practice of converting eunuchs has been forbidden since Roman times. The first known prohibition was issued under Domitian (81-96) and confirmed under Nerva (96-98). Emperor Trajan (98-117) extended Sulla's law de sicariis et veneficiis to physicians engaged in the trade, but there were no fewer eunuchs. Since emperors had authority only within the empire, eunuchs could come from abroad, creating a lucrative trade. The value of a eunuch under 10 years of age was 30 solidus, 50 solidus if the eunuch was over 10 years of age, and 60 if he possessed any art. Eunuchs were a valuable and always welcome gift to the emperor. Under Constantine the Great (306-337) the old laws against eunuchs were renewed, but even then they were poorly enforced, and under his successor Constantius II (337-361) the eunuch priest Eusebius, at the head of numerous young eunuch cubicularii, was an imposing force at court. The influence of Eusebius, who recognized only the authority of the emperor, was so great that when he turned to Arianism, the religious policy of the whole empire was changed. Eunuchs, whispering "with their ingratiating and, whatever their age, eternally childish voices" accusations against the popular general Ursicinus, made the historian Ammianus Marcellinus nostalgic for the emperor Domitian, who fought against "such abominations".

In the 5th century, Emperor Leo I (457-474) forbade trade only with eunuchs who were citizens of the empire, resulting in a flood of barbarian eunuchs into Byzantium. Emperor Justinian I (527-565), in view of the high mortality rate during such operations — an average of three out of 90 operated on survived, dedicated a special novella "142" to eunuchs. It confirmed the previous laws and established that the perpetrators and accomplices of the operation would be punished according to the law of talion, and if they survived the operation, they would be sent to hard labor and their property would be confiscated. If the perpetrator of the operation was a woman, she was punished by confiscation of property and exile. Eunuch slaves were entitled to emancipation. The novella did not apply if the operation was performed for medical reasons. For the barbarian peoples, the trade of eunuchs continued to be a profitable occupation, and Procopius of Caesarea mentions it as an important source of revenue for the kings of the Abasgoi. However, when Justinian, through his ambassador, the castrated Abasgian Euphratius, ordered these people to abandon the trade, they took the ban as an opportunity to revolt against the Empire. These measures did not change the situation, and Emperor Leo VI's (886-912) novel "60" forced a relaxation of the previous legislation, replacing the law of talion for performing castration with a fine of 10 pounds of gold and exile for 10 years; if the perpetrator held a position at court, he was dismissed. Like Justinian, Leo VI did not prohibit the operation for medical reasons, nor did he prohibit it for free citizens. The law did not specify at what age the person to be operated on could give his consent, and in any case his parents could give their consent ex post facto.

There are several types of eunuchs' classification that existed in Byzantine legal and non-legal literature. From a legal point of view, there were two categories of eunuchs: (Note: Its author was probably the sixth-century jurist Theophilus.) (in Ancient Greek — ἐκτομίαι, ἔκτομοι), that is, those who had completely lost their reproductive capacity as a result of surgical intervention (in Ancient Greek —σπαδόνες, θλαδίαι), whose inability to reproduce was the result of disease. Since the inability to reproduce was guaranteed for the former and only probable for the latter, these categories had different legal statuses. Thus, unlike σπαδόνες, ἐκτομίαι could not marry, adopt children, or bequeath property. However, Leo VI considered it unjust to deprive ἐκτομομοι of the joys of fatherhood, and restored this right to them by his novel "26".

== Political impact ==
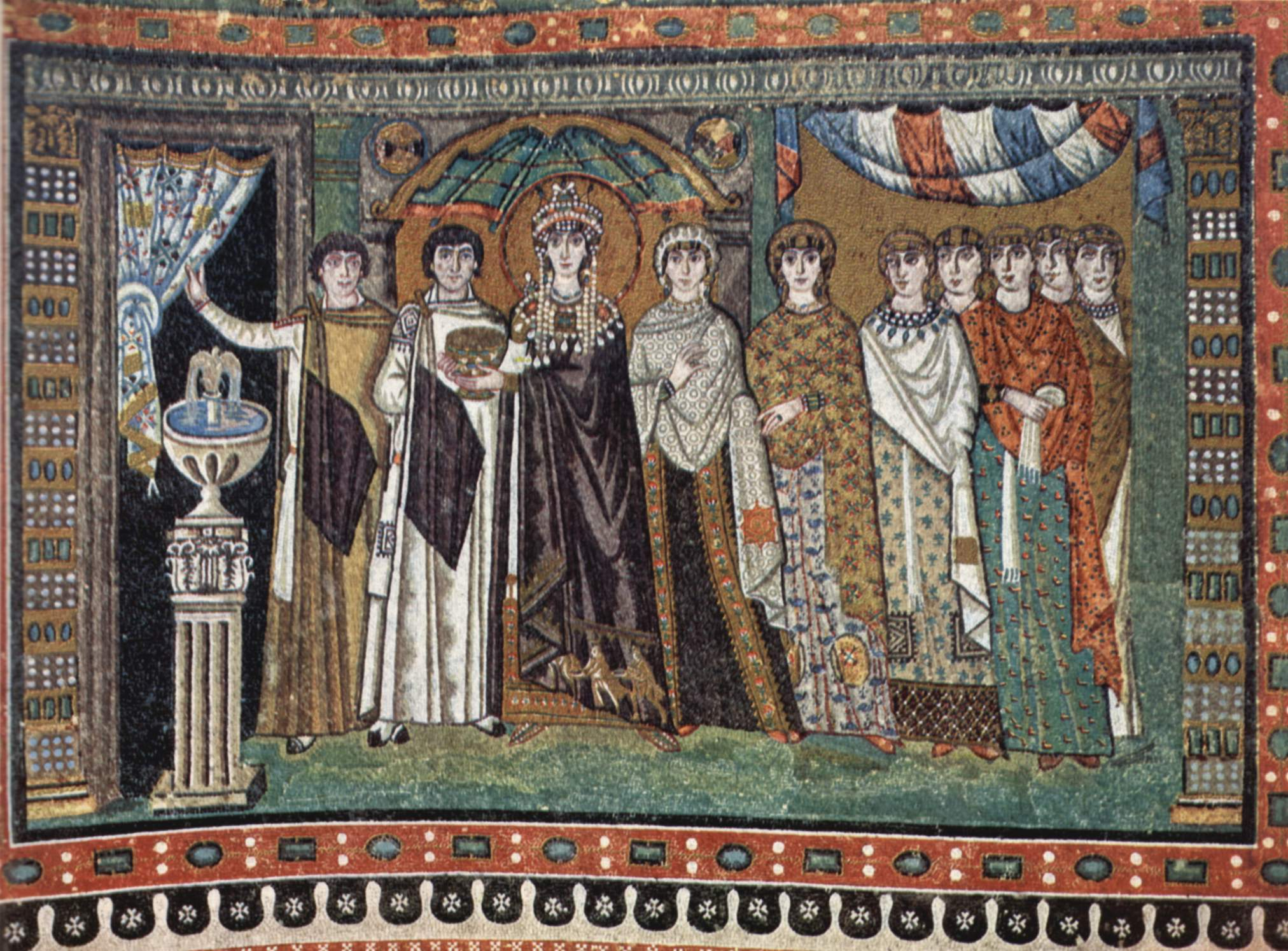
Empress Theodora and her court (mid 6th century). Theodora's chief eunuch holds the door hinge.

The Byzantine eunuchs formed a powerful and well-organized entity (in Ancient Greek — ἡ τῶν εὐνοῦχων τάξις), and in the structure of the Byzantine bureaucracy a special category of titles and ranks was reserved for them. Eunuchs could hold almost all public offices, and in the equality of titles eunuchs had an advantage over the "bearded ones". (Note: Since about Emperor Constant II, the fashion for beards, which had fallen into oblivion in the 4th-6th centuries, was revived. In the Byzantine view, beards were a sign of masculinity, distinguishing real men from eunuchs.) The origin of the custom of having eunuchs at court is attributed to Eastern influence. However, the female part of the palace (gynaeceum) required numerous servants, and the implied resemblance of eunuchs to sexless angels and seraphs made them indispensable for imperial ceremonies. Given the frequent coups d'état, the fact that eunuchs posed no danger as potential pretenders to the throne was important. (Note: See, for example, the remark of Evagrius Scholasticus on the conspiracy of Amantius that preceded the accession of Justin I (518-527): "A very strong man was then also the keeper of the imperial bedchambers, Amantius. Since he himself could not rule the Roman Empire, he wanted to place the crown of autocratic power on Theocritus, a man devoted to him".) Nevertheless, the role of the head of the court eunuchs, who held the title of Praepositus sacri cubiculi, was extremely important. The influence of the eunuchs was determined by their proximity to the emperor, their influence on whom the emperor would communicate with and when, and from whom he would learn of important events first. Eunuchs were also known to charge fees for audiences and personal appointments.

In the 4th century, the eunuchs Eusebius under Constantius II and Probatius under Jovian (363-364) were agents of Arian influence at court. At the beginning of the reign of Arcadius (395-408), Eutropius, the only eunuch who had attained the rank of consul, enjoyed the greatest authority at court. The public outrage caused by this appointment eventually cost Eutropius his head. The sole reign of Arcadius' son, Theodosius II (408-450), which began at the age of 7, was under the constant supervision of eunuch tutors who had served his father. The most famous of these was Chrysaphius, who came to prominence in the 440s and took an active part in the struggle between his sister and Theodosius' wife for influence over the emperor. In the religious disputes of his time, Chrysaphius sided with the heretic Eutyches against the patriarch Flavian. From the story of Priscus of Panias it is known that in 449 Chrysaphius was entrusted with a responsible mission to organize an attack on the leader of the Huns, Attila. Delicate missions were entrusted to eunuchs and later emperors — Flavius Zeno (474-491) Urbikia, Anastasius I (491-518) Kalopodius and Amantius. Emperor Justinian II (685-695, 705-711), who lost his throne and his nose largely due to the actions of his treasurer Stephen Persus, did not lose confidence in the eunuchs after his return to power and continued to entrust them with important missions.

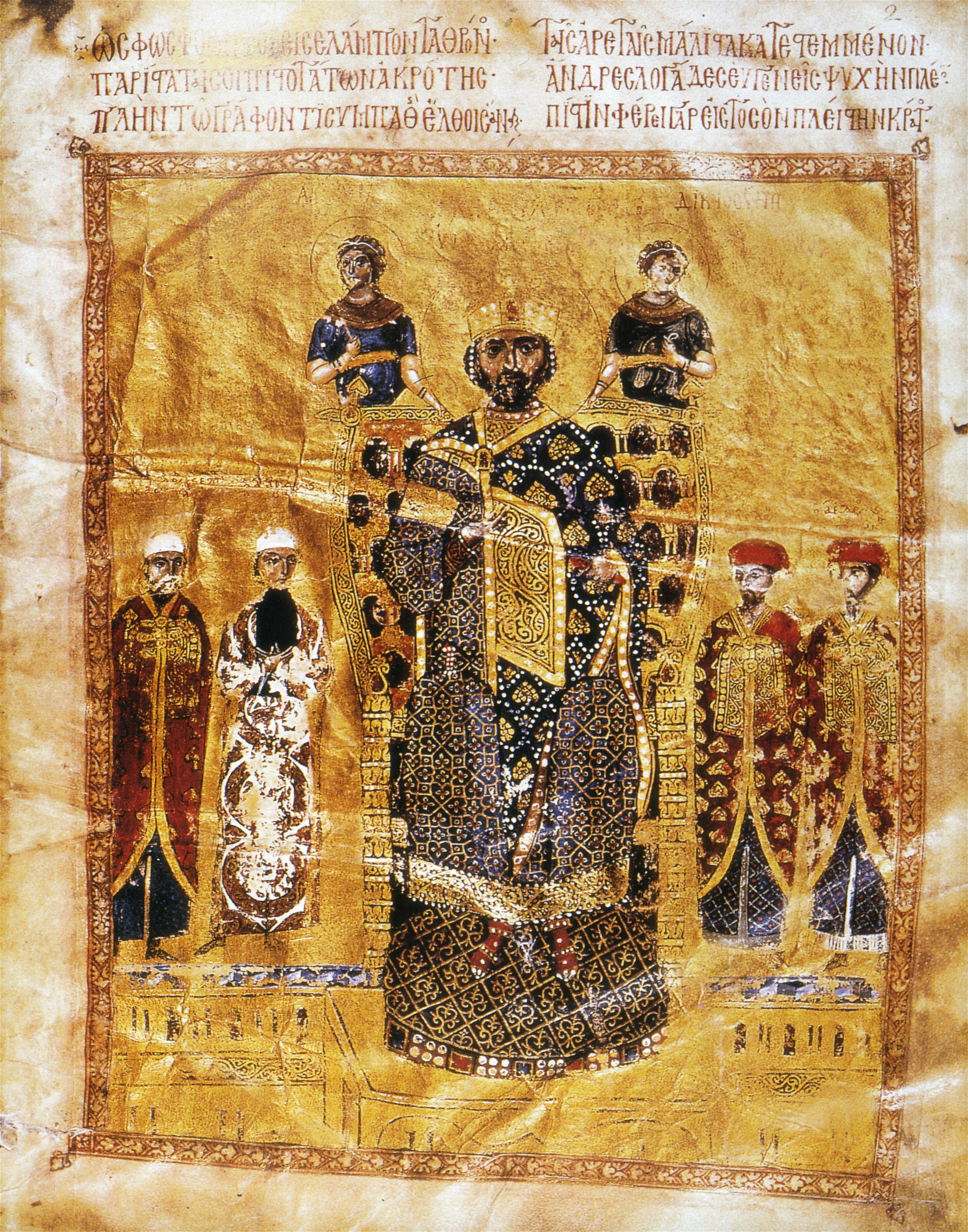
Emperor Nikephoros III Botaneiates (1078-1081) and his courtiers. The eunuchs stand to the right of the emperor, which may indicate their more privileged position compared to the "bearded ones".

Thereafter, eunuchs are constantly mentioned in high positions, performing responsible tasks, or as participants in conspiracies. A slight decrease in references to them is noted during the reign of Basil I (867-886), who, as a rare exception, held the position of parakimomenon, traditionally reserved for eunuchs, under Michael III (842-867). Under his son, Leo VI (886-912), the eunuchs regained their influence at court. In the complex conflict over the marriages of Emperor Leo VI, the eunuch Samonas helped him in his struggle with the Patriarch Nicholas Mystikos, who was rewarded with the position of parakimomenon, which had been vacant since the time of Basil I. He was succeeded in this function by Constantine the Paphlagonian, who, together with his relative, the eunuch Constantine Gongyles, placed at the head of the fleet, supported the commander Leo Phocas against Romanos I Lekapenos (920-940). Among the large number of eunuchs who appeared during the minority of Constantine VII (913-959), the most notable is the illegitimate son of Romanos I, Basil, who was the actual ruler of the state under three successors of Constantine VII and was deposed from power only in 985 by Basil II (976-1025). Prominent eunuchs of the tenth century included Joseph Bringas, (Note: His relative was Michael VI Stratioticus, who reigned 100 years later.) who intrigued against Nicephorus Phocas (963-969), and Christopher, mentioned by Liutprand of Cremona in connection with the unfriendly reception he gave to the embassy of Emperor Otto II.

Under Basil II's brother Constantine VIII (1025-1028) and the emperors who came to power through Empress Zoe, eunuchs continued to enjoy the full confidence of the emperors. Powerful in the 1030s, the eunuch John Orphanotrophus was able to secure the throne for his brother Michael IV of Paphlagonian (1034-1041) by marrying him to Zoe, and then for his nephew Michael V (1041-1042) by securing his adoption by the empress. John's other three brothers, two of whom were eunuchs, occupied the most important civil and military posts in the empire. When Michael V came to power, he surrounded himself with the Scythian eunuchs he had previously bought, to whom he entrusted the protection of his person and high title. Determined to rid himself of the influence of his family members, especially Orphanotrophus, Michael V allied himself with his other eunuch uncle, Constantine, and was eventually deposed and blinded by an angry mob. The elder Zoe and her sister Theodora and then Michael VI Bringas (1056-1057) ruled the empire through eunuchs. Not many "all-powerful" eunuchs are known after that, except for the famous treasurer Nicephorica, the de facto ruler of the empire under Michael VII Doukas (1071-1078).

Under the Komnenos dynasty, the eunuchs, still numerous in the chambers of the Great Palace, did not reach the top of power. Fulcher of Chartres visited Constantinople during the First Crusade and estimated their number in the capital at 20,000. Under the 11th century emperors and in the Empire of Nicaea (1204-1261) eunuchs are mentioned but not in the first roles, but after the restoration of the Byzantine Empire in Constantinople the eunuchs finally lost their position. The Palaiologos dynasty, who perceived the cultural influence of the West, looked at the physical features of eunuchs as a disadvantage, and the idea of hereditary transfer of power, which was firmly rooted enough, did not require the previous precautions.

== In musical culture ==
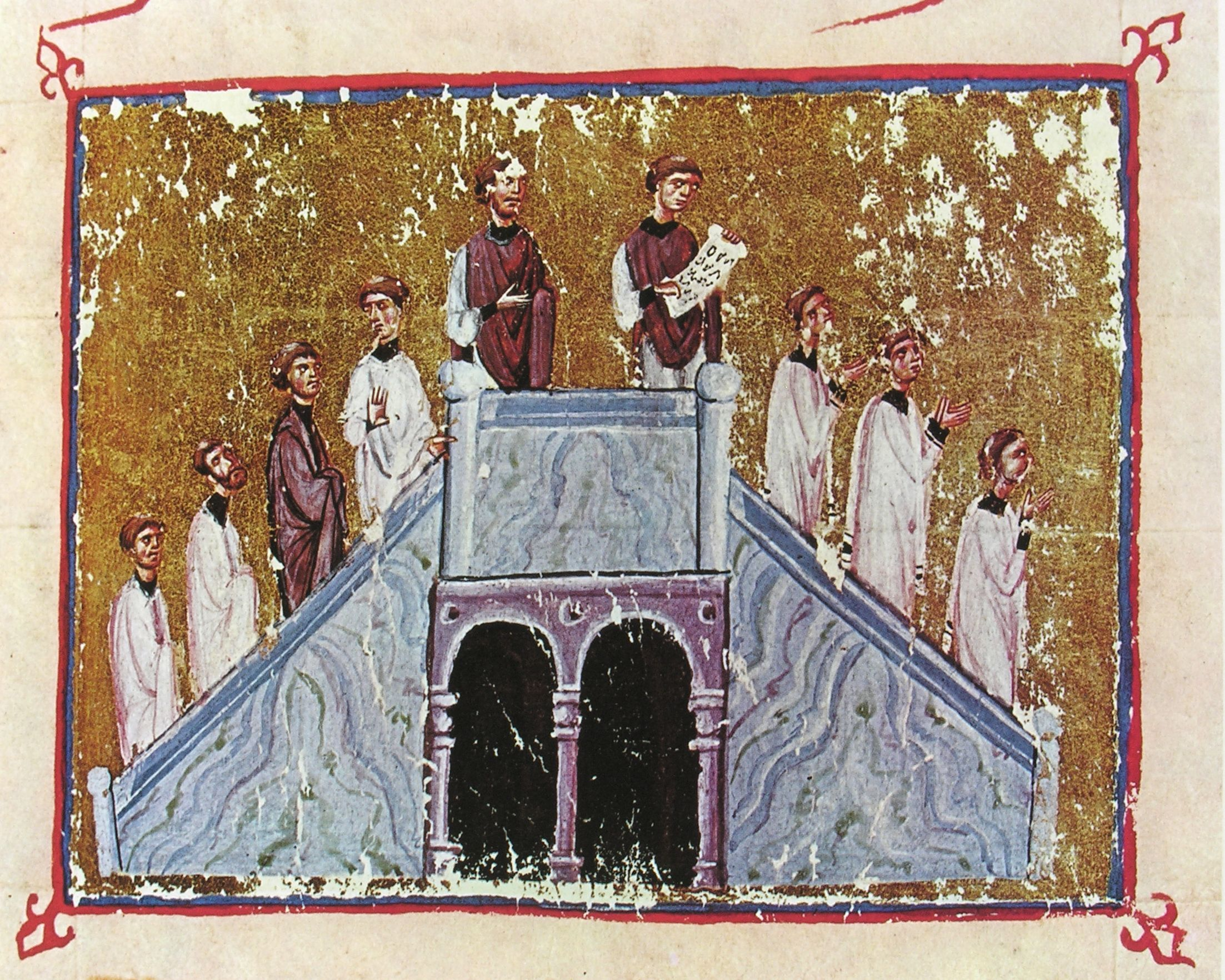
Son of priests and reading from the ambo, 11th century.

The vocal abilities of the eunuchs were appreciated in the early period of Byzantine history. Socrates Scholasticus tells of the choir led by the eunuch Brizon in connection with the struggle against the Arians in the late 4th century, which was led in the capital by Bishop John Chrysostom, also with the help of night chants. Accordingly, Brison is credited with introducing two important features of the musical culture of Constantinople, which lasted until the fall of the city in 1204: the antiphon of two choirs and the use of castrato singers in the palace and the church. Under Justinian I, the number of singers was fixed at 25, two choirs of 12 and a choirmaster. The eunuchs, who enjoyed the absolute trust of the emperor, were among the few who had the right to spend the night in the palace. According to George Kedrenos, the origin of this prohibition is attributed to Emperor Leo V (813-820), a great admirer of castrato singing. Before Christmas matins in 820, an assassin entered the palace through a door left open for singers living in the city and made a successful attempt on the emperor's life. From then on, the "bearded" singers were denied access to the palace and, disadvantaged, they eventually ceded the dominant position in music to eunuchs.

The peculiarities of their appearance —tonsure and the absence of facial hair— make it easy to distinguish them in pictures, the first known of which is in the Menologion of Basil II (late 10th century).

From the 10th century onward, references to eunuchs became more frequent and their treatment improved. Attempts were made to theorize the existence of eunuchs. In the second half of the 10th century,, Symeon the Metaphrast wrote a hagiography of the prophet Daniel, whom he considered to be a eunuch. In discussing Daniel's castration, Simeon draws a parallel between the eunuchs surrounding the royal throne and the heavenly choir of angels — both are outside of ordinary time and space. In the twelfth century, bishop Theophylact of Ohrid, whose brother was a eunuch and priest of Hagia Sophia, wrote a treatise in defense of eunuchs. Based on the writings of the apostles and church fathers, as well as the provisions of Roman law, the author concludes that castration is not a crime against God, does not diminish the soul, and is comparable to pruning a mature vine. Theophylact constructs his work in the form of a dialogue between a certain monk and a eunuch. The monk opposes singing in general, and the eunuch proves its necessity by referring to the angelic singing introduced into the Church by the prophet Daniel, Ignatius of Antioch, and John Chrysostom. In the middle of the 12th century, the abundance of eunuchs among the singers of Constantinople was noted by the French chronicler Odo of Deuil.

After the fall of Constantinople in 1204, the eunuchs fled from the capital to the countryside, Trabzon and abroad, including Russia and southern Italy. After 1261, the tradition of singing in Hagia Sophia Cathedral was restored, but with difficulty, as it was mainly oral.

== Eunuchs and the church ==
=== Hierarchs ===
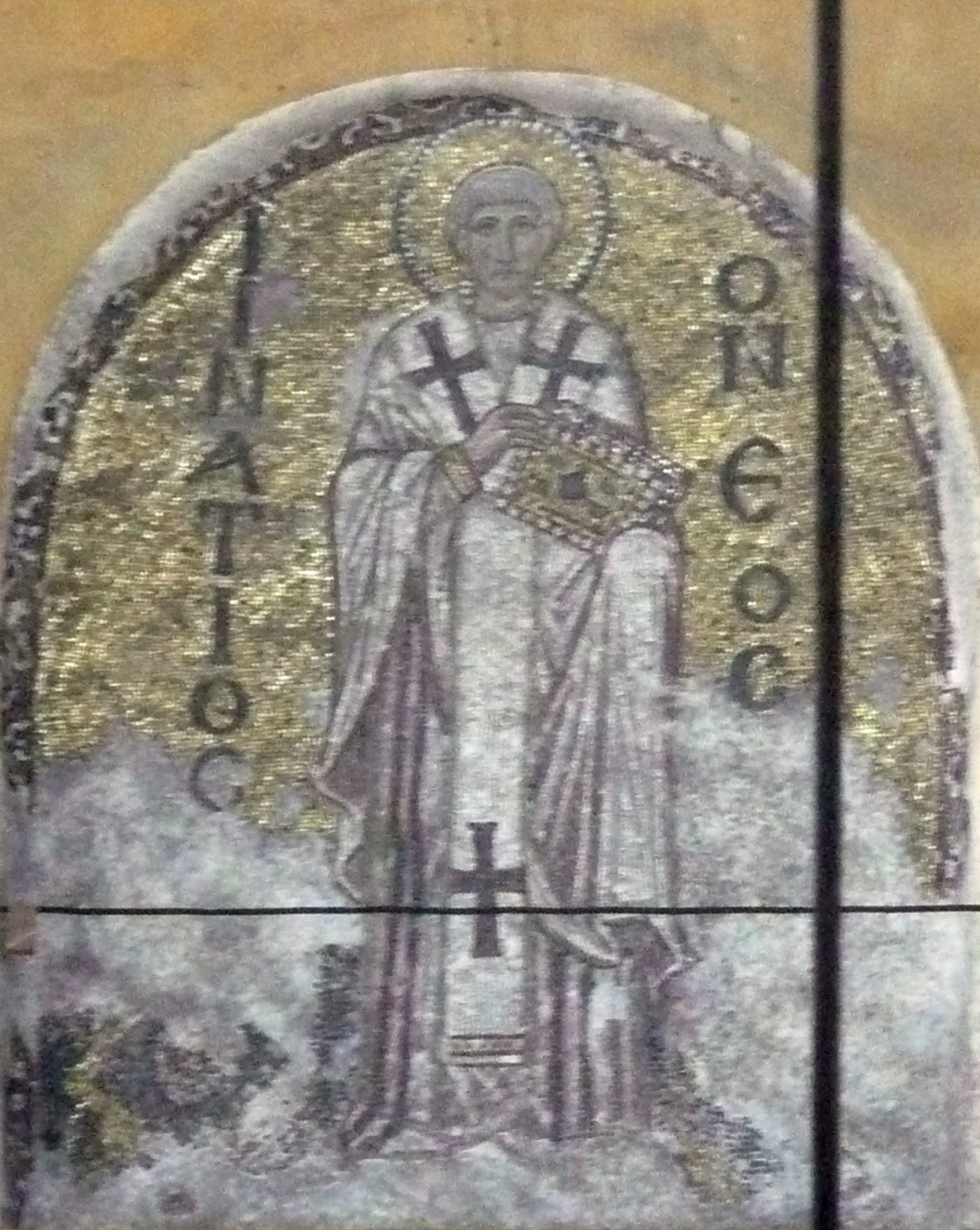
Patriarch Ignatius. Mosaic in the Hagia Sophia, Constantinople.

Christianity does not forbid eunuchs to be priests. The 21st and 22nd apostolic canons concerning eunuchs were confirmed in 325 by the first Council of Nicaea, which states that "anyone who, because of illness, has had his members cut off by physicians, or who has been scraped by barbarians, may remain in the clergy". At the same time, voluntary circumcision was forbidden. Accordingly, the Byzantine Church had a significant number of eunuch clergy, including bishops and patriarchs.

Among the patriarchs of Constantinople, the following eunuchs are known:

- Germanus I (715-730). Born between 630 and 650, he was castrated for political reasons in 669, having already reached an age unsuitable for the operation;
- Nicetas I (766-780), of Slavic slave descent, raised from a mere priest to the rank of patriarch by Emperor Constantine V in violation of church canons;
- Methodius I (843-847). The chronicler known as Theophanes Continuatus relates that when his opponents tried to slander him by accusing him of having an affair with a certain woman, the Patriarch at first did not understand the meaning of the accusations against him and then "rose a little from his chair, rolled up his clothes and exposed his puckered penis, strange and not like a man's". He then told the story of how he had found such freedom from passions as a result of praying to the Apostle Peter;
- Ignatios (847-858, 867-877), baptized and tonsured as a monk after the overthrow of his father, Emperor Michael I Rangave (811-813);
- Stephen II (925-928);
- Theophylact (933-956), the youngest son of Emperor Romanos I Lekapenos (919-944), was baptized in his youth and successively passed through all levels of the church hierarchy, assuming the patriarchal throne at the age of 16;
- Polyeuctus (956-970), excommunicated by his own parents;
- Constantine Leichoudes (1059-1063) — some sources list this patriarch among the eunuchs. Probably because he had previously held the position of protovestiarius, which was often, but not exclusively, held by eunuchs. According to N. A. Skabalanovich, this opinion is wrong;
- Eustratius Garida (1081-1084).

Given the relative abundance of eunuch patriarchs, we can assume that eunuchs were among the bishops and lower clergy. There were no restrictions on eunuchs' participation in monastic life, but there were special monasteries for them. Several such monasteries are known. One of them, dedicated to Lazarus of Bethany, was founded in the reign of Leo VI or earlier, another was founded by the historian Michael Attaliates, for whom a diataxis has been preserved. According to this document, only "eunuchs and men free from passions" were allowed to enter the monastery. "Bearded" monks were not allowed, except in case of blood relatives, who had to be old and pious. In 1083, Emperor Alexios I Komnenos, who did not generally dislike eunuchs, forbade them to enter the monasteries of Mount Athos. This widespread practice was frowned upon by Western clergy. Bishop Liutprand of Cremona, who visited Constantinople in the mid-10th century, (Note: According to Liutprand, this was against the Church law.) disapproved of it; a century later, Pope Leo IX (1049-1054) censured Patriarch Michael Cerularius (1043-1058).

=== Saints ===
The metaphor of Christians as eunuchs is found in the New Testament ("For there are eunuchs who were born that way, and there are eunuchs who have been made eunuchs by others — and there are those who choose to live like eunuchs for the sake of the kingdom of heaven", Mt 19:12). Accordingly, Christian writers often viewed male saints as eunuchs in a spiritual sense. The gender identity of monks, who live a secluded and modest lifestyle, has been a topic of discussion since the birth of the monastic movement. A common view in Byzantium associated eunuchs with angels, also genderless. Although voluntary castration was condemned by the Church, eunuch-like social behavior by monks was welcomed. However, eunuchs as such were not welcome in monasteries and were even expelled. Thus, at the beginning of the reign of Emperor Alexios I Komnenos, the former droungarios of the Watch, Simeon, was expelled from the Athonite monastery of Xenophonte. Simeon, an extremely wealthy man, appealed to the emperor and was eventually not only restored to the monastery, but became its abbot. In this context, it is not surprising that there were eunuch saints, although their lack of physical ability to succumb to sexual temptation made their merit less significant.

A number of Byzantine eunuch saints are known, several of which may be differentiated and for which detailed hagiographies have survived:

- Nicetas the Patrician (d. 836), opponent of iconoclasm. Castrated by his parents;
- Patriarch Ignatius of Constantinople (d. 877). His dramatic life and important role in the greatest intra-church conflict of the 9th century made him the most famous eunuch saint. The hagiography of Ignatius, compiled by Niketas David Paphlagon, portrays him as a righteous man and an innocent victim of the intrigues of Patriarch Photius;
- Nicephorus, Bishop of Miletus. During the reign of Emperor Nikephoros II Phokas. He was also castrated by his parents for the sake of his ecclesiastical career;
- John the Lenten, who founded a monastery in Petra in the late 11th-early 12th century. Became a eunuch because of illness;
- Bishop John of Heraclea (d. 1328), castrated as a child because of illness.

Some scholars suggest that Symeon the New Theologian (d. 1022) was also a eunuch, but there is no reliable confirmation of this, however.

== Eunuchs in the army ==
=== 6th—10th centuries ===
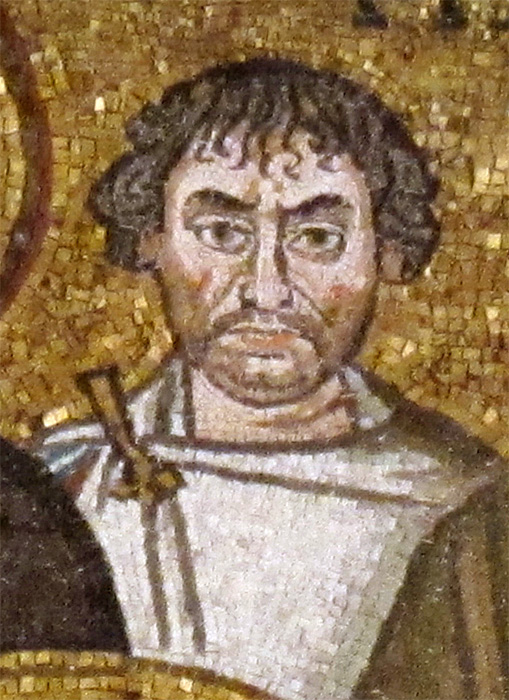
General Narses on the mosaic of the Basilica of San Vitale, Ravenna

Eunuchs were often found among the top Byzantine army and navy commanders from the time of Justinian I. Historians explain that emperors preferred to trust court eunuchs rather than experienced commanders because the former, if successful, could not claim to have seized power in the empire. More often, however, eunuchs failed to demonstrate military talent. Under Justinian, Narses was awarded the highest ranks available to eunuchs for his successes in the wars against the Ostgoths, and Solomon was elevated to patrician for his victories over the Vandals. Another Narses, whose career was in the second half of the sixth century, fought successfully with Persia. After Phocas came to power (602-610), Narses began a rebellion on the Persian frontier, which Phocas sent the eunuch Leontius to suppress. Leontius was defeated, and the emperor's nephew Domentziolus was sent to replace him. Finally, Narses was captured, marched in disgrace through the Hippodrome, and burned alive. By the end of the 8th century, several less successful generals are known to have been eunuchs with varying degrees of probability, but eunuch generals became particularly influential with the beginning of the independent reign of Empress Irene (797-802). Her reign was marked by a struggle for influence between two powerful eunuchs, Staurakios, patrician and logothetes tou dromou who was honored with a triumph for his military victories over the Slavs, and Aetios, strategos of the Anatoliacs. The struggle was won by Aetios, who tried to secure the throne for his brother Leo, but a conspiracy resulted in Nikephoros I (802-811) becoming emperor.

Under Basil I (867-886), Procopius, the proto-eunuch, is known to have died at the head of the army. In the 9-10th centuries eunuchs often led the fleet, as for example John under Romanos I Lekapenos (920-944), for victories over the Slavs received the title of parakimomenos. Thanks to the successes of the generals Nicephorus II Phocas (963-969), Peter Phocas and Michael Vurza, Antioch and the surrounding area were recaptured. According to historian George Kedrin, Peter Phocas was once the personal eunuch of Emperor Nicephorus, purchased at a young age and then given military training. For his bravery and success in his wars with the Slavs in Thrace, he was given the title of stratopedarch. A few years later, in 970, the patrician Nicholas, a trusted eunuch of John Tzimiskes (969-976), repulsed an Arab attack on Syrian cities. In the long reign of the warlord emperor Basil II Porphyrogenitus (976-1025), only two eunuch commanders are known, the strategist of Abydos Romanus and the cubicularius Orestes, who was defeated in Sicily.

=== 11th-15th centuries ===
After the death of Basil II, his brother Constantine VIII (1025-1028) became sole emperor. Previously, he had been formally considered his brother's co-emperor, but was actually excluded from the government. With Constantine's accession, there was a typical Byzantine reshuffling of the highest officials, and court eunuchs were appointed to the most important posts: Nicholas — parakimomenos and domestick schola, Simeon — droungarios of the Watch and Eustratius the Great Etheriarch. At the same time, many members of the former military aristocracy, accused of conspiracies, were blinded, exiled, or stripped of their property. Having made these appointments, Constantine finally withdrew from affairs, allowing the eunuchs to enrich themselves unchecked at public expense. During this period, the military activity of Byzantium, which had reached the height of its military and economic power in 1025, declined sharply. In Syria, the failures of the Catharean eunuch Michael Spondyles significantly worsened Byzantium's position in the region. Relatively successful in 1028 in Georgia acted against Bagrat IV domestic school Nicholas. With the death of Constantine VIII, the male line of the Macedonian dynasty was cut off, and a representative of the old military family Roman III Argyr (1028-1034), whom Constantine VIII's daughter Zoe married, was enthroned thanks to the efforts of the court party headed by Drungarius Simeon. Military failures of Roman's board have been connected including with kept command posts in army eunuchs — Michael Spondyla and replaced him Niceta in Syria, continued to act ineffectively in Italy. In his domestic policies, Roman III tried to find support from both the court party and the previously oppressed aristocrats, who were amnestied under him. However, power in the country gradually concentrated in the hands of a small circle of court eunuchs, which provoked protests from Argyr's relatives. As a result, the emperor, who had neither popular nor aristocratic support, was overthrown by a conspiracy led by the court eunuch John the Orphanotrophus.

Three brothers of Emperor Michael IV of Paphlagon (1034-1041) were eunuchs, and one of them, Constantine, was a successful military governor of Antioch. Another eunuch commander prominent in this reign, Basil the Pediadite, was notorious for disastrous defeats in Sicily and Serbia. Many eunuchs at the head of the army are known from the reign of Constantine IX Monomachos (1042-1054). In Armenia, the great etherearch some kind of court position Constantine and the rhaiktor Nikephoros fought wars. Nicephorus, together with the famous commander Katakalon Kekaumenos, was then sent against the Pechenegs. The incompetence of Nicephorus led to an ignominious defeat at Diaken in 1049, after which the Pechenegs plundered Macedonia and Thrace, even reaching the walls of Constantinople. To reflect the danger from the capital, one of Empress Zoe's sleeping eunuchs, John the Philosopher, was sent to lead a detachment of imperial bodyguards and palace servants in an attack on the Pechenegs while they slept, cutting them all down. Also significant in the reign of Constantine IX was the rebellion of the commander George Maniakes, whose fight was entrusted to the court eunuch Stephen. The quick death of Maniakes greatly facilitated the task of Stephen, who was honored with a triumph for his successes.

At the end of 1054 Constantine IX became seriously ill, and the main task of the ruling court group, headed by the logothetes tou dromou, the eunuch John, the prothonotary of the Droma Constantine and the "keeper of the imperial inkwell" Basil, was the search for Monomakh's successor. Their choice has stopped on the governor of Bulgaria Nikephoros Protevon. However, the group of supporters of the Empress Zoe's sister, Theodora, in which the eunuchs Neceta Xilinit, Theodore and Manuel played the leading roles, managed to win over the palace guards to their side, as a result of which Theodora was proclaimed sole Empress. In the spring of 1056, new appointments were made, and from the eunuchs, Theodore, the domestikos of the Scholae of the East, was appointed proedrus Theodore. The death of Theodora and the accession of Michael VI Bringas (1056-1057) did not change the policy towards the army, and the replacement of experienced military commanders by court eunuchs and capital officials continued. In the 12th-13th centuries, eunuchs are mentioned as generals, but already under the Paleolochs eunuch commanders are unknown; perhaps this is due to the strengthening of the idea of the legitimacy of the hereditary transmission of imperial power, which in turn made the successes of non-eunuch generals non-threatening.

== Differences between eunuchs ==
=== Positions ===
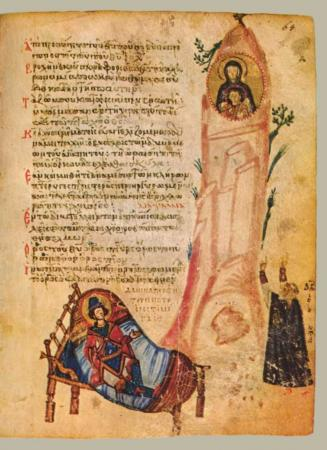
A miniature from the Chludov Psalter (9th century) depicts the prophet Daniel, reclining in Persian clothes. In the eyes of the Byzantines he looked like a court eunuch.

With few exceptions, Byzantine eunuchs had access to all court positions open to "bearded" men. According to a list of court ranks compiled during the reign of Leo VI, known as the Kletorologion of Philotheus, the court hierarchy had 60 higher ranks, about 50 of which were available to eunuchs. It is likely that they were also often appointed to middle and minor municipal positions. However, there were three higher positions that were closed to eunuchs for reasons of court protocol: praefectus urbi, quaestor, and domestikos. Military posts of the rank of domesticus, such as domesticus of the excubitors or droungarios, which included command of the court guard, were not open to eunuchs, but either this prohibition was not absolute or it was observed for a short time. Already during the reign of Constantine VIII, the eunuch Nicholas held the post of domestic of the schola, and the eunuch Simeon the post of drungarius of the vigla. Constantine, the brother of Michael IV of Paphlagon, was also a domestique of the schola. Other examples of this kind are known from the eleventh century. However, no eunuch is known to have held the offices of quaestor or prefect of the city. Nor was the office of basileopator, "father of the emperor", created by Leo VI for his future father-in-law Stylianos Zaoutzes, open to eunuchs.

Meanwhile, in the 9th and 10th centuries, there were 10 positions available only to eunuchs:

- Parakimomenos (Classical Greek παρακοιμώμενος from Classical Greek πᾰρᾰ — a prefix meaning: rows, contiguity + Classical Greek κοιμάω — to put to bed; to go to bed) of the emperor;
- Protovestiarius (Ancient Greek πρωτοβεστιάριος, from Ancient Greek πρωτεύω — to be the first, to take the first place + Latin vestiarius — storage (chest) for clothes, wardrobe) of the emperor;
- Epi tes trapezes (Ancient Greek δομέστικος ἐπὶ τῆς τραπέζης — literally: domestic (butler) at the table, from Ancient Greek επὶ τῆς Greek δομος — house, palace, Ancient Greek ἐπί — at, at and Ancient Greek τράπεζα — table, meal) of the emperor;
- Epi tes trapezes of the empress;
- Papia (Ancient Greek παππίας — daddy, father) of the Great Palace;
- Deuteros (Ancient Greek δεύτερος — second) of the Grand Palace, assistant to the papacy, second only to the papacy;
- Pinkernes (Ancient Greek (ἐ)πιγκέρνης; Latin pincerna — cupbearer) of the emperor;
- Pinkernes of the empress;
- Papia (Ancient Greek παππίας) of Magnaura;
- Papias of Daphne.

=== Titles ===
In the Byzantine hierarchy, in addition to the division by position, there was a hierarchy of noble titles associated with this division. In the early period of Byzantine history, numerous examples of eunuchs are known in the four highest categories of nobility — illustres, respectabiles, clarissimi, perfectissimi. Although, with the notable exception of Eutropius, the consular rank was not available to eunuchs, they could be given the honorary title of consul. Nor could eunuchs be given the titles of ipata and antipata, corresponding to consul and proconsul. Between the eighth and ninth centuries, the system of class division of the nobility changed: the patrician became a separate title, unrelated to the illustris, and some court offices and their associated duties began to be treated as titles. Philotheus' Clitorologus gives a list of 28 titles of "bearded" and 8 titles of eunuchs:

- Nipsistiarios (Ancient Greek νιψιστιάριος from Ancient Greek νίψις — ablution, washing), whose duties included washing the emperor: he served the emperor a golden basin for washing his hands before leaving the Grand Palace;
- Cubicularius (ancient Greek κουβικουλάριος from Latin cubiculum — room, rest, bedchamber) — the emperor's bedchamber. Until the middle of the 20th century, the title nipsisthiarius was considered to be lower than cubicularius. The modern view was formed after Nicolas Oikonomides discovered a previously unknown Escorial Taktikon in the Escorial vault;
- Spatharokoubikoularios (ancient Greek σπαθαροκουβικουλάριος — sword-bearer of the opuschival, from ancient Greek σπάθα — broad blade, spatha + ancient Greek φορά — to carry + Latin cubiculum — room, rest, opuschival);
- Ostiarios (ancient Greek ὀστιάριος ← Latin ostiarius — gatekeeper), whose duty was to present officials to the emperor and empress;
- Primicerius (ancient Greek πριμικήριος ← Latin primi-cerius, whose name stands first on the wax tablets (tabulae ceratae), i.e. chief, head, manager);
- Protospatharios (ancient Greek πρωτοσπαθάριος — the first bodyguard, literally: first swordsman from ancient Greek πρωτο — first + ancient Greek σπάθα — broad blade, spatha + ancient Greek φορά — to carry);
- Praepositus (ancient Greek πραιπόσιτος ← Latin praepositus - superior from Latin prae — ahead + Latin positio — position);
- Patrician (ancient Greek πατρίκιος ← Lat. patricius — patricius, from Lat. pater — father).

In addition to those listed above, the 10th century saw the creation of a large number of titles that were also available to the "bearded ones".

== Medical aspect ==
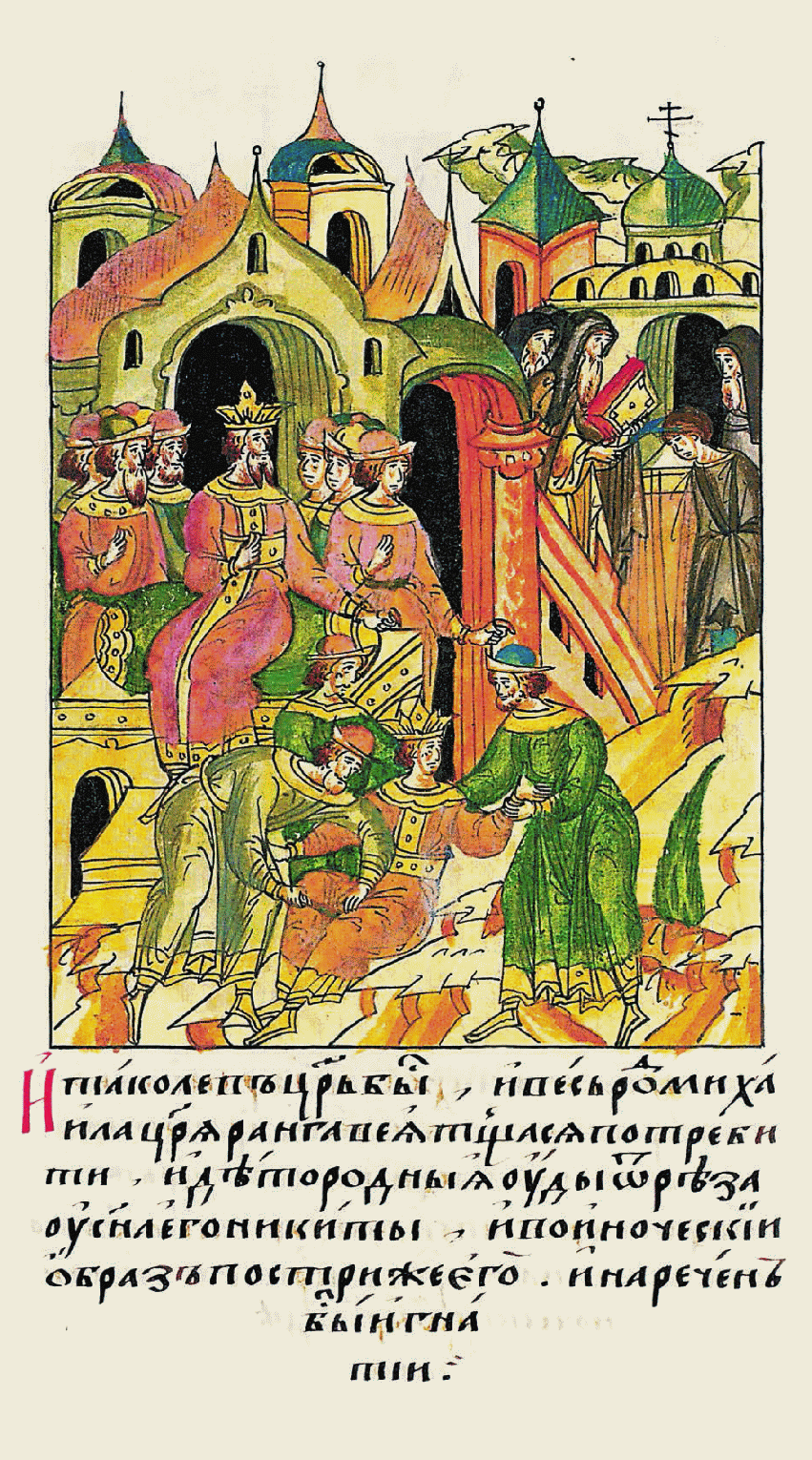
Leo V the Armenian orders the castration of the future Patriarch Ignatios — the son of the deposed emperor: "And so Leo became king, he wanted to destroy the entire family of King Michael Rangavei and cut off the fertile wombs of his son Nikita, tonsured him in the monastic image and named him Ignatius" (Illustrated Chronicle of Ivan the Terrible, 16th century).

Byzantine scientific ideas about the physiology of eunuchs were influenced by the theories of Hippocrates, Aristotle and Galen. According to Hippocrates, the human body should be in harmony and balance, which can only be achieved by a healthy man. Accordingly, women and eunuchs were considered incapable of controlling their desires for food, drink, and bodily pleasures. While women were considered the opposite of men in this respect, eunuchs occupied an intermediate position. Aristotle also valued balance and proportionality in the human body, but he viewed matters of sex in a hierarchical sense. In his view, men are hot and women are cold. Male heat was necessary for the production of sperm, and sperm itself is the repository of this heat. The eunuchs, according to Aristotle, were incapable of producing it, were cold, and therefore like women. Galen, who believed that the sexual systems of women and men were in principle the same, only arranged differently, nevertheless brought eunuchs and women closer together, since both were, by nature or custom, both soft and moist. On the question of comparative body temperature, Galen agreed with Aristotle. The physicians Aecius of Amida (5th-6th century) and Alexander of Tralles (6th century) argued that since the bodies of eunuchs were similar to those of young men, women, and children, milder treatment was appropriate for them than for men.

The "Summary of Medicine" by the Byzantine physician Paul of Aegina describes two methods of castration. In the first, the boy was placed in a tub of hot water, and after the body relaxed, the testicles were crushed with the fingers. The second method involved cutting the testicles with a scalpel; this method was considered preferable because it resulted in fewer complications and offered greater assurance of the result. In describing the gifts that the embassy of Liutprand of Cremona brought to the Byzantine court in 969, the chronicler reports on four Khwarezmian eunuchs who had not only their testicles but also their penises removed. Survival statistics after castration are contradictory. While the 2nd-century physician Soranus of Ephesus considered the operation quite safe, Emperor Justinian I cites a horrifying statistic — only 3 out of 90 operated on survived. There are known statistics on the mortality rate of black eunuchs in Coptic monasteries, which reaches 75%, but in general, according to the author of a monograph on castration, G. Taylor, it is "a simple and safe operation for human beings".

== Historiography ==
For a long time, under the influence of E. Gibbon, Byzantine researchers were extremely negative about the role of eunuchs. There were no systematic studies on this subject. In the review work "The Byzantine Civilization" by S. Runciman, only one page is devoted to the eunuchs, but the importance of this layer of society, which, controlling the bureaucratic machine of the Empire, prevented the feudal tendency to concentrate power in the hands of the hereditary nobility. The prevailing view was that their power was exercised under weak emperors by means of flattery and slander due to unsatisfied ambitions stemming from sexual frustration. The first work devoted specifically to eunuchs is J. Dunlop's study "The Office of the Grand Chamberlain in the Later Roman and Byzantine Empire" about the position of the praepositus sacri cubiculi, published in 1924.

...since he [Constantius II] feared his generals and distrusted his ministers, the successes of his arms only led to the establishment of the rule of the eunuchs over the Roman world. These unfortunate creatures, an ancient product of Oriental jealousy and Oriental despotism, were imported into Greece and Rome by the contagion of Asiatic luxury ... in the palaces of the unworthy sons of Constantine they soon multiplied, and little by little acquired first a familiarity with the secret thoughts of Constantius, and then the control of them. The disgust and contempt with which everyone regarded this ugly class of men seemed to have corrupted them and rendered them incapable of any noble feeling or action which public opinion attributed to them. ("The History of the Decline and Fall of the Roman Empire" by Edward Gibbon)

Modern scholars unanimously recognize the importance of the eunuchs, who, according to the definition of A. P. Kazhdana, were "a special group of the ruling class of Byzantium". The systematic study of this class began with a series of works by the French Byzantinist R. Guilland, published in 1940-1960. The English sociologist C. Hopkins, studying the role of the eunuchs and their importance, compares them to the court Jews of 17th and 18th century Germany, noting that in both cases they were scapegoats for the rest of society. Since the 1980s, numerous studies have appeared in which historians have attempted to analyze the reasons why former slaves were able to achieve such power. According to K. Hopkins, there were prejudices in society against eunuchs —as well as against Jews— and perhaps they were only credited with influencing the emperors, while they made their unpopular or incomprehensible decisions themselves. For example, even Julian found it difficult to determine whether Emperor Constantius II refused him an audience of his own volition or whether he was influenced by Eusebius' presumption. In her opinion, the emperors' need for eunuchs arose from the need to delegate some of their power when they could not find reliable support in the army and the nobility.

Another area of research has been gender issues, attempts to understand the place of eunuchs as the "third sex" in Byzantine society.

== Bibliography ==
=== Primary sources ===
- Аммиан Марцеллин. Римская история / Пер. Ю. А. Кулаковского и А. И. Сонни под ред. Л. Ю. Лукомского. — СПб.: Алетейя, 1994. — 558 p. — (Серия «Античная библиотека». Раздел «Античная история»). — 5000 экз.
- Деяния Вселенских соборов, изданные в русском переводе при Казанской духовной академии. — 3 изд. — Казань: Тип. Казанской духовной академии, 1910. — V. I. — 402 p.
- Лиутпранд Кремонский. Антаподосис; Книга об Оттоне; Отчёт о посольстве в Константинополь / пер. И. Дьяконов. — М.: Русская панорама, 2006. — 192 p. — 1200 copies. — ISBN 5-93165-160-8.
- Михаил Пселл. Хронография. Краткая история / Любарский Я. Н.. — СПб.: Алетейя, 2003. — 397 p. — ISBN 5-89329-594-3.
- Продолжатель Феофана. Жизнеописания византийских царей. — СПб.: Алетейя, 2009. — 400 p. — (Византийская библиотека. Источники). — ISBN 978-5-91419-146-4.
- Прокопий Кесарийский. Война с готами / Пер. С. П. Кондратьева. Вступительная статья 3. В. Удальцовой. Ответственный редактор Е. А. Косминский. — М.: Издательство АН СССР, 1950. — 514 p. — 5000 copies.
- Сократ Схоластик. Церковная история. — М.: РОССПЭН, 1996. — 368 p. — ISBN 5-86004-071-7.

=== Researches ===
==== In English ====
- Garland L. Byzantine Empresses: Women and Power in Byzantium AD 527—1204. — L.—N. Y.: Routledge, 1999. — 343 p. — ISBN 0-415-14688-7.
- James L. Men, Women, Eunuchs: Gender, Sex, and Power // John Haldon (ed.) The social history of Byzantium. — Oxf.: Wiley-Blackwell, 2009. — pp. 31–50. — ISBN 978-1-4051-3240-4.
- Hopkins K. Conquerors and Slaves. — Cambr.: Cambridge University Press, 1978. — 268 p. — ISBN 0-521-21945-0.
- Kuefler M. The manly eunuch. — Chicago: The University of Chicago Press, 2001. — 437 p. — ISBN 0-226-45739-7.
- Moran N. Byzantine castrati // Plainsong and Medieval Music. — Cambr.: Cambridge University Press, 2002. — V. 11, No. 2. — С. 99–112. — doi:10.1017/S0961137102002073
- The Oxford Dictionary of Byzantium: in 3 vol. / ed. by Dr. Alexander Kazhdan. — N. Y.; Oxf.: Oxford University Press, 1991. — P. 746-747. — ISBN 0-19-504652-8.
- Ringrose K. The Perfect Servant: Eunuchs and the Social Construction of Gender in Byzantium. — Chicago: University of Chicago Press, 2003. — 312 p. — ISBN 0-226-72015-2.
- Rowlands R. Eunuchs and Sex: Beyond Sexual Dichotomy in the Roman World. — Columbia: University of Missouri, 2014. — 148 p.
- Runciman S. The Byzantine Civilization. — L.: E. Arnold & Company, 1933. — 320 p.
- Taylor G. Castration: An Abbreviated History of Western Manhood. — L.: Routledge, 2000. — 307 p. — ISBN 0-203-90455-9.
- Tougher S. F. Byzantine eunuchs: an overview, with special reference to their creation and origin // Elizabeth James (ed.) Women, Men and Eunuchs: Gender in Byzantium. — N. Y.: Routledge, 1997. — P. 168—184. — ISBN 0-415-14685-2.
- Tougher S. F. Holy eunuchs! Masculinity and eunuch saints in Byzantium // P. H Callum, Katherine J. Lewis Holiness and Masculinity in the Middle Ages. — Cardiff: University of Wales Press, 2004. — P. 93–108. — ISBN 0-7083-1894-0.
- Tougher S. F. The Eunuch in Byzantine History and Society. — L.: Routledge, 2008. — 256 p. — ISBN 0-415-42524-7.

==== In German ====
- Dieter S. Lobpreis des Eunuchen. — München: C.H.Beck, 1994. — 27 p.
- Die Patriarchen der ikonoklastischen Zeit / L. Ralph-Johannes (hg). — Frankfrt an Main: Peter Lang, 1999. — 302 p. — (Berliner Byzantinischen Studien, bd. 5). — ISBN 3-631-35183-6.

==== In Russian ====
- Васильевский В. Г. Византия и печенеги (1048—1094) // ЖМНП. — 1872. — V. 164. — pp. 116–165, 243—332.
- Гиббон Э. Закат и падение Римской империи. — М.: Терра, 2008. — V. II. — ISBN 978-5-275-01702-1.
- Каждан А. П. С остав господствующего класса в Византии XI—XII вв. Анкета и частные выводы. Ч. VI. Евнухи // Античная древность и средние века. — Свердловск, 1973. — Issue 10. — pp. 184–194.
- Каждан А. П. Рецензия на: N. Oikonomidès, Les listes de préséance byzantines des IXe et Xe siècles // Византийский временник. — М.: Наука, 1974. — V. 36. — P. 202.
- Мохов А. С. Командный состав византийской армии в правление Константина VIII // Античная древность и средние века. — Свердловск, 1997. — Issue 28. — pp. 19–33.
- Мохов А. С. Командный состав византийской армии в. XI в.: правление Романа III Аргира (1028—1034) // Античная древность и средние века. — Свердловск, 2000. — Issue 31. — pp. 173–197.
- Мохов А. С. Командный состав византийской армии в 1055 — 1057 гг. // Античная древность и средние века. — Свердловск, 2002. — Issue 33. — pp. 109–122.
- Мохов А. С. Византийская фамилия Спондилов в XI-XIII вв. // Античная древность и средние века. — Екатеринбург, 2011. — Issue 40. — pp. 269–287.
- Скабаланович Н. А. Византийское государство и церковь в XI веке. — СПб.: Издательство Олега Абышко, 2004. — 416 p.

==== In French ====
- Guilland R. Recherches sur les institutions byzantines. — Berlin: Akademie-Verlag, 1967. — 607 p.
- Janin R. La géographie ecclésiastique de l'Empire Byzantin: Le siège de Constantinople et le patriarcat oecuménique. Les églises et les monastères. — Paris, 1969. — 605 p.
