= Basil the Younger =

Byzantine Greek holy man and visionary

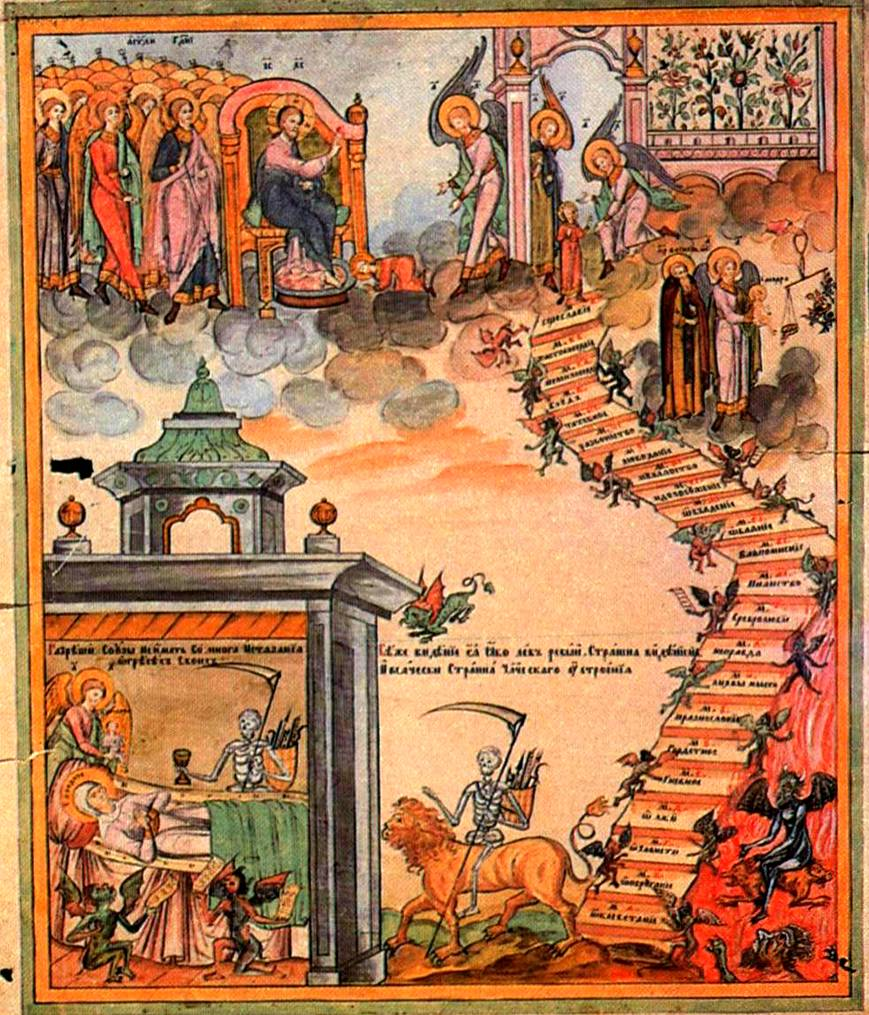
19th-century Russian depiction of Gregory's vision of Theodora's death and the aerial toll houses. This vision was granted him by Basil's intercession and begins in Basil's house, where Theodora lay dying.

Saint Basil the Younger (Note: Greek: Βασίλειος ὁ Νέος, Basileios ho Neos, sometimes translated Basil the New.) (died 26 March 944/952) was a Byzantine Greek holy man and visionary. He is the subject of a Greek hagiographical biography, the Vita sancti Basilii iunioris, (Note: A conventional Latin title, which translates "Life of Saint Basil the Younger". A common abbreviation for the title is VBiun.) written by his pupil Gregory. Although the Vita portrays its subject as historical, there is yet no consensus whether Basil or even Gregory were real persons or fabrications.

== Vita ==
=== Manuscripts ===
The Vita sancti Basilii iunioris is preserved in whole or in part in a total of 24 manuscripts dating from the 12th to the 19th century. The fullest is the 16th-century Greek MS no. 249 of the Synodal (Patriarchal) Library in Moscow and published in François Halkin, Bibliotheca Hagiographica Graeca, 3rd edition (Brussels, 1957). Two 13th-century manuscripts are also known. Parisinus Gr. 1547 is an abridged text that uses less florid language generally. It has been published by François Combefis in the Bollandist Acta Sanctorum, March III (1668). The codex Iviron 478 from Mount Athos contains only the visions and none of the biographical or historical material. It has been published by S. G. Vilinskij in Zapiski Imperatorskogo novorossijskogo universiteta (Odessa, 1911). Despite the publication of parts of these three manuscripts, no critical edition was produced before 2014, when a critical edition with an annotated English translation appeared.

In the 14th-century, the Vita was translated into Middle Bulgarian. This text was only found in 1975 in codex no. 20N from St Catherine's Monastery, Sinai. The translation was made by a certain Father Peter.

Extant manuscripts of the Vita include the following.

- Moscow Synodal Library gr. 249 (also known as Codex Mosquensis Synodalis gr. 249; or Vladimir 402) (16th century): 385 folios, 47 quires; 21.7 x 15.2 cm
- Parisinus gr. 1547 (1286)
- Iviron 478 (13th century)
- Dionysiou 187 (1328)
- Panteleimon 202 (18th century)
- Genoa, Franz. Missio urbana 31 (14th century)
- Russian State Library, MS Egorova 162 (Old Church Slavonic)
- South Slavonic manuscript
- Arabic manuscript, Damascus (1693)

=== Date of composition ===
The composition of the Vita is usually dated to between 956 and 959. The terminus post quem is provided by the death of the Patriarch Theophylaktos, whom Gregory readily criticizes; the terminus ante quem by the death of Constantine VII, since his joint reign with his son Romanos II is mentioned but there is no reference to Romanos' sole reign. The terminus ante may, however, be pushed back to 961 (the death of Romanos' mother Helena Lekapene) or even 963 (date of composition of the Vision of Kosmas).

=== Contents ===
The contents of the Vita are organized as follows.

1. Basil in Constantinople
2. Theodora's journey to heaven
3. Basil's miracles and prophecies
4. Gregory's vision of heaven
5. Basil's final days, death, and burial

==== Vision of Theodora ====
One of the most famous passage's in the Vita concerns the death of Theodora, Basil's servant. Shortly after her death, Gregory asks Basil if Theodora was rewarded in the afterlife and Basil grants Gregory a vision. His vision begins in Basil's house, where Theodora is dying. She is surrounded by Ethiopians (representative of demons), who bear documents recording all her sins. As Theodora's soul exits her body, two angels weigh her good deeds against her sins until Basil arrives to provide a scarlet bag full of gold, his prayers, to outweigh her sins. The demons leave and Theodora and the angels go up through the air.

The passage through the air towards heaven is interrupted by 21 toll houses (telonia), each manned by demons and dedicated to exposing a specific sin:

1. Slander
2. Verbal abuse
3. Envy
4. Falsehood
5. Wrath and anger
6. Pride
7. Idle chatter
8. Usury and deceit
9. Ennui and vainglory
10. Avarice
11. Excessive wine drinking and inebriation
12. Malice
13. Magic and divination
14. Gluttony
15. Idolatry and heresy
16. Homosexuality and pederasty
17. Adultery
18. Murder
19. Theft
20. Fornication
21. Heartlessness and cruelty

Theodora's soul runs out of good deeds to outweigh her sins by the fifth toll house and must rely thereafter on Basil's gold. The angels tell her that at baptism each person receives a guardian angel to record her good deeds and a demon to record her sins. If she fails at any toll house, the demons cast her soul into Hades. The angels inform Theodora, who did not practice confession, that only through confession and penance can one erase one's sins while alive. The toll house of fornication, they add, is the most dangerous one. Theodora successfully passes through the toll houses, enters heaven and sees God.

== Life ==
Of the 301 printed pages of the Moscow version of the Vita, 38 cover the vision of the death of Basil's servant Theodora and 162 cover the visions of the Resurrection of the Dead and the Last Judgement. The Vita is as much a piece of visionary literature as it is a standard saint's life. "The author ... is evidently less concerned with [Basil's life] as such than with using him as a pretext for recounting numerous other matters of interest to him."

Chronologically, the Vita is divided into three parts separated by long gaps. Between the first and second parts there is a gap of 17 years and between the second and third one of about 20 years.

=== Move to Constantinople ===
At the start of the Vita, Basil is living in Asia Minor as a grass-eating hermit or boskos. Arrested on suspicion of espionage, he is brought to Constantinople, where he is interrogated, tortured and thrown before a lion by the parakoimomenos Samonas. Unbroken, he does not even reveal his name and is thrown into the sea, where he is rescued by dolphins, who take him to Hebdomon. From there he returns to Constantinople, where he is sheltered by a poor husband and wife named John and Helena. This episode is said to take place in the tenth year of the joint reign of Leo VI and Alexander, which would be 896. Samonas, however, did not become parakoimomenos until 907. (Note: The story of Basil's false arrest as a spy has strong parallels to a story about Niketas the Paphlagonian in the Vita Euthymii. This latter incident can be dated to 907 or 908, when Samonas was parakoimomenos.)

After the death of John and Helena, Basil moves into the house of Constantine Barbaros, Samonas' successor as parakoimomenos, in the Arkadianai quarter. There he spent the rest of his life except for a week he spent in the Great Palace of Constantinople and a short period he spent as a guest in the house of the Paphlagonian brothers Anastasios and Constantine Gongylios near the Harbour of Eleutherios. These brothers, relatives of Barbaros and of the tourmarches of Paphlagonia, are said to have been held in high regard by those reigning at the time, which points to the period of the regency of Empress Zoe Karbonopsina in 914–919 for Basil's stay. All three of Basil's hosts—Barbaros and the Gongylioi—were eunuchs. Barbaros disappears from the historical record after the failed revolt his relative, Leo Phokas, in 919.

During his stay in the Great Palace, Basil rebukes Romanos I for his greediness and lechery, a reproach that the emperor, indulgent towards monks, did not mind. Basil also convinces a certain Kosmas, who had ambitions of becoming emperor, to abandon his worldly pursuits and become a hermit near Nicomedeia. This story seems to be based on that of Kosmas the Monk, who had a famous vision in 933.

=== Predictions and visions ===
The second part of the Vita recounts in detail the rebellion of Constantine Doukas in 913, which Basil is said to have predicted. Gregory admits that this part of the work is little concerned with Basil. It may be included because Doukas's widow was forced to retire to an estate in Paphlagonia or as an excuse to criticize the Patriarch Nicholas Mystikos.

The third part of the Vita begins in the reign of Romanos I, specifically after the death of his son Christopher (931) and at a time when there were seven persons of imperial rank in the palace. This is probably a reference to the widowed Romanos I, and his sons Stephen and Constantine and their wives, as well as Romanos' daughter Helena Lekapene and her husband, Constantine VII. The date of the marriages of Stephen and Constantine are not known with certainty, but Stephen's wife, Anna Gabalas, was only crowned in 933 and Constantine's first wife is not recorded before 939. Basil, however, prophesies that Helena will give birth to another daughter and then a son named Romanos, Since Romanos II was born in 938, this prophecy could only have been made in the mid-930s.

In this part, Basil also predicts the Rus' attack on Constantinople in 941 four months in advance. God also gives him foreknowledge of the planned coup d'état of Romanos I's son-in-law Romanos Saronites. Basil tries to talk Saronites out of it, but is treated cruelly. Saronites then falls ill and dies. This is contradicted by John Skylitzes, who says that Saronites entered a monastery during the reign of Romanos II. Skylitzes does link his retirement to a rebellion, but does not implicate Saronites in it.

=== Death and burial ===
Basil is said to have died on 26 March during Lent, which corresponds to either 944 or 952. The earlier date is more likely. According to Gregory, he was buried by Constantine Barbaros in the private church of the Theotokos on the Asian side of the strait across from the capital. This is chronologically implausible, given that Barbaros is not heard of after 919. The likely source for this story is Pseudo-Symeon, who records that Barbaros' father owned "a small suburban estate by the sea" near the capital and that Leo VI turned it into a monastery. The chronological inconsistencies and creative use of sources tell against the general historicity of the Vita.
