= Constantine Gongyles =

Byzantine aristocrat and official

Constantine Gongyles (Greek: Κωνσταντῖνος Γογγύλης; fl. c. 913/4–949) was a Byzantine eunuch and court official who led a failed expedition against the Emirate of Crete in 949.

== Biography ==
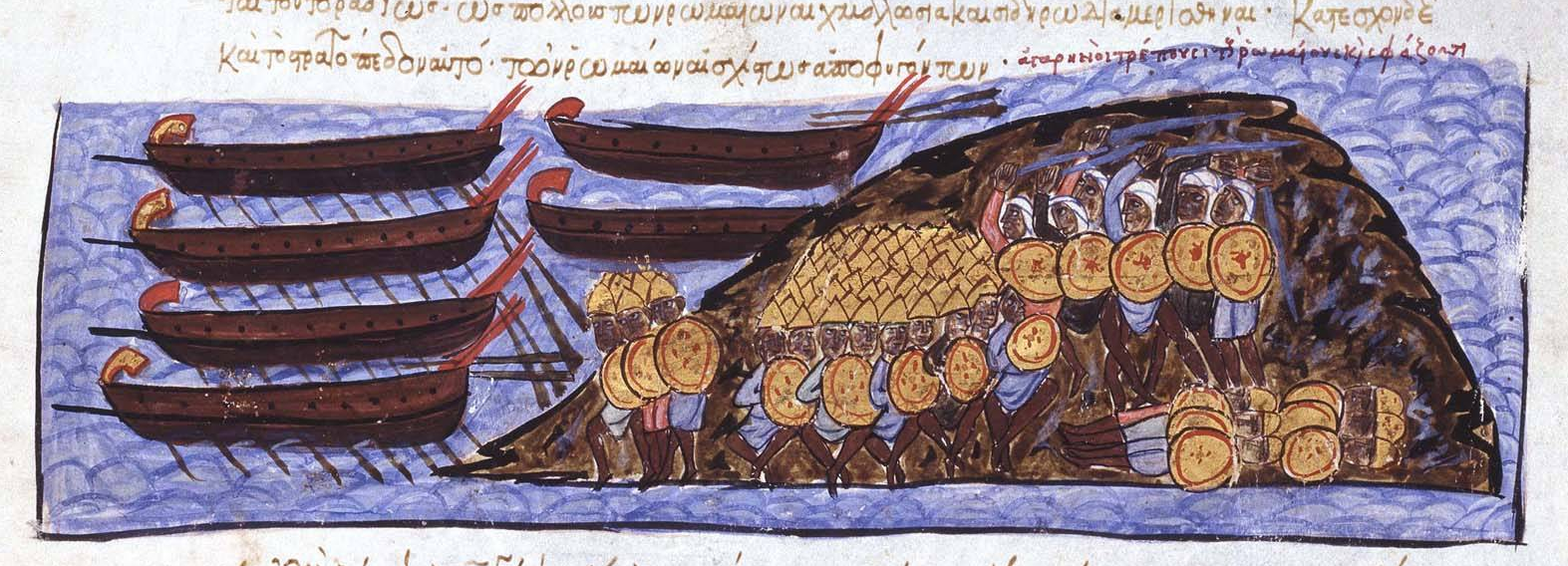
The Cretan Saracens defeat the Byzantines. Miniature from the Madrid Skylitzes

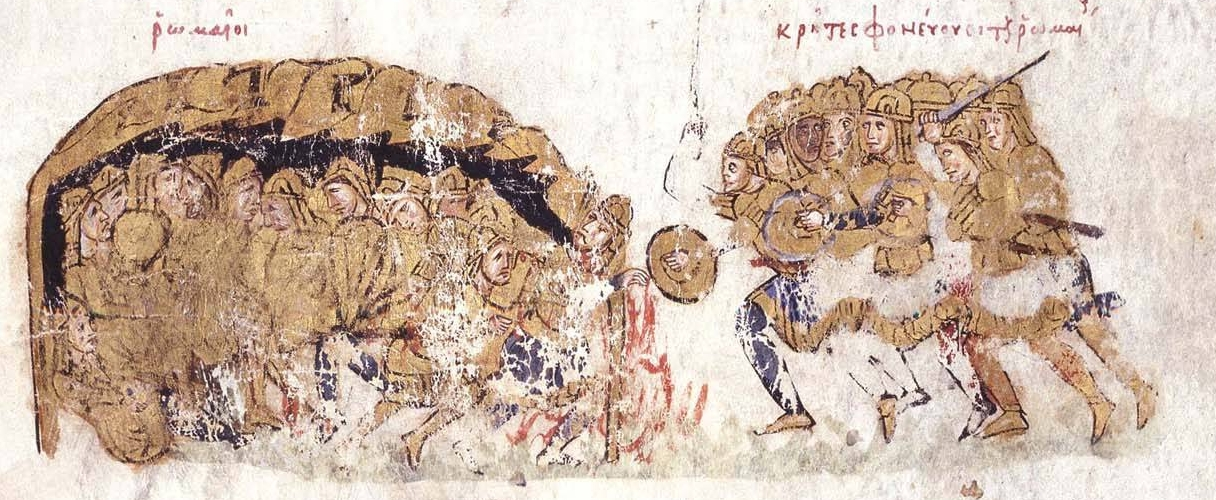
The Cretan Saracens slay the sleeping Byzantines. Miniature from the Madrid Skylitzes

Nothing is known of Constantine's early life, except that he came from Paphlagonia. The Life of St. Basil the Younger hagiography indicates that he and his brother Anastasios were relatives of the eunuch Constantine Barbaros, who rose to power at court as a favourite of the powerful parakoimomenos Samonas and of Emperor Leo VI the Wise (r. 886–912). Constantine first rose to prominence in 913/4, when following the death of Emperor Alexander (r. 912–913), the Empress-regent Zoe Karbonopsina selected him and his brother as her personal councillors. On this occasion, Constantine was raised to the supreme noble rank of patrikios.

Constantine Gongyles wielded great influence during the regency of Zoe (914–919), but he fell from power under Emperor Romanos I Lekapenos (r. 920–944). Although Gongyles had intervened to save Lekapenos from blinding for his role in the disastrous Battle of Acheloos, the Gongyles brothers supported the general Leo Phokas the Elder in his struggle for the throne against Lekapenos. The brothers were quick to change sides when Lekapenos gained the upper hand, but they are not mentioned in the sources during the latter's reign.

Upon Lekapenos's deposition in December 944, however, Constantine Gongyles was appointed as the head of the Byzantine navy. Thus, in 949 he was placed in charge of a large-scale attempt to recover the island of Crete from the Saracens. The expedition ended in a disastrous failure, which the Byzantine chroniclers attribute to his lack of military experience: he neglected to fortify the camp of the expedition force, which was routed and well-nigh destroyed in a surprise night attack by the Saracens. Gongyles himself barely escaped on his flagship. His fate thereafter is largely unknown; at the time of the composition of the Life of St. Basil the Younger (probably in the 960s), he and his brother lived in retirement and were spending their fortune on philanthropic and charitable causes.

== Sources ==
- Guilland, Rodolphe (1967). Recherches sur les institutions byzantines [Studies on the Byzantine Institutions]. Berliner byzantinische Arbeiten 35 (in French). Vol. II. Berlin and Amsterdam: Akademie-Verlag & Adolf M. Hakkert. OCLC 878894516.
- McGeer, Eric (2008). Sowing the Dragon's Teeth: Byzantine Warfare in the Tenth Century. Washington, DC: Dumbarton Oaks Studies. ISBN 978-0-88402-224-4.
- Pryor, John H.; Jeffreys, Elizabeth M. (2006). The Age of the ΔΡΟΜΩΝ: The Byzantine Navy ca. 500–1204. Leiden and Boston: Brill Academic Publishers. ISBN 978-90-04-15197-0.
- Ringrose, Kathryn M. (2003). The Perfect Servant: Eunuchs and the Social Construction of Gender in Byzantium. Chicago: The University of Chicago Press. ISBN 978-0-226-72015-9.
