= Spatharokoubikoularios =

The spatharokoubikoularios (Greek: σπαθαροκουβικουλάριος, "sword-chamberlain") was a Byzantine court dignity reserved for eunuch palace officials. He was a ceremonial sword-carrier assigned to the personal guard of the Byzantine emperor. It later became a simple court rank, being the third-lowest dignity for eunuchs, coming after the ostiarios and before the koubikoularios. According to the Klētorologion of 899, the insigne of the rank was a gold-handled sword.

== Sources ==
- Bury, J. B. (1911). The Imperial Administrative System of the Ninth Century – With a Revised Text of the Kletorologion of Philotheos. London: Oxford University Press. OCLC 1046639111.
- Ringrose, Kathryn M. (2003). The Perfect Servant: Eunuchs and the Social Construction of Gender in Byzantium. Chicago: The University of Chicago Press. ISBN 978-0-226-72015-9.
