= Damian (parakoimomenos) =

Damian (Greek: Δαμιανός) was a senior Byzantine eunuch official during the reign of Emperor Michael III (842–867), serving as the head chamberlain (parakoimomenos) to the emperor.

== Biography ==
Theophanes Continuatus reports that Damian was a eunuch and of Slavic origin. He held the influential post of head chamberlain (parakoimomenos), with the rank of patrikios, under Michael III (r. 842–867), and perhaps, according to the later Patria of Constantinople, already under Michael's father Theophilos (r. 829–842) as well. The Byzantinist Henri Grégoire suggested that Damian might be identifiable with the Byzantine admiral, known only from Arabic sources as " Ibn Qatuna", who led the Sack of Damietta in 853, by interpreting the Arabic name as a corruption of the title epi tou koitonos ("in charge of the imperial bedchamber").

He belonged to the circle of high officials who opposed Theoktistos, the powerful minister who monopolized power during the first half of Michael's reign. He was instrumental in securing the recall of Michael's uncle Bardas from exile, culminating in the death of Theoktistos and the assumption of control over state affairs by Bardas in 855. In 865, however, he fell out with Bardas, who began scheming against him, and persuaded Michael to dismiss him and have him tonsured. His successor became Basil the Macedonian, the future founder of the Macedonian dynasty.

Damian himself retired to the church of the palace of the quarter of St. Mamas. According to the Patria, he also built the monastery known as tou Damianou ("Damian's").

== Sources ==
- Guilland, Rodolphe (1967). "Le Parakimomène". Recherches sur les institutions byzantines, Tome I (in French). Berlin: Akademie-Verlag. pp. 202–215.
- Lilie, Ralph-Johannes; Ludwig, Claudia; Zielke, Beate; Pratsch, Thomas, eds. (2013). "Prosopographie der mittelbyzantinischen Zeit Online". Prosopographie der mittelbyzantinischen Zeit Online. Berlin-Brandenburgische Akademie der Wissenschaften. Nach Vorarbeiten F. Winkelmanns erstellt (in German). De Gruyter.

Unknown Title last held by Scholastikios	Parakoimomenos of the Byzantine emperor before 842–865	Succeeded by Basil the Macedonian
