= Constantine Barbaros =

Byzantine eunuch servant

Constantine (Greek: Κωνσταντῖνος), surnamed Barbaros ("the barbarian", ὁ βάρβαρος), was a Byzantine eunuch servant who rose to become parakoimomenos (head chamberlain) of the Byzantine emperor Leo VI the Wise in 911–912, displacing his own former master, Samonas. He held again the post during the regency of Zoe Karbonopsina in 913–919, where he played an important role in the governance of the state. He lost his post after he supported his relative Leo Phokas the Elder in his unsuccessful rivalry with Romanos I Lekapenos over control of the throne, but he was later appointed to the post of primikerios by Lekapenos.

== Origin ==
Constantine was the son of a peasant or landholder named Metrios, and hailed from Paphlagonia. He was surnamed Barbaros, lit. 'the barbarian', but it is not clear why. The Life of Basil the Younger reports that it reflected his foreign origin, but his family seems to have been native Byzantine; it is possible that the Life's account is a later attempt to explain his surname. Alternatively it could be a derogatory reference to his rustic roots from Paphlagonia. He had been castrated by his father at a young age precisely to open up the possibility of a career at court. Constantine had at least one sister, who was married to the general Leo Phokas the Elder, and was a relative of the eunuch officials Constantine Gongyles and Anastasios Gongyles.

== Service under Samonas and rise to power ==
Constantine is first mentioned in the sources as a servant or follower—some modern researchers have called him a slave, but this is unlikely—of the magistros and kanikleios Basil, of whom nothing is known. He then entered the service of the powerful imperial chamberlain, Samonas. The latter was a eunuch Arab prisoner of war who became a favourite of Emperor Leo VI the Wise (r. 886–912), rising to the rank of patrikios, the highest court rank open to a eunuch, and the position of protovestiarios. By 907 Samonas had been awarded the supreme court post of parakoimomenos.

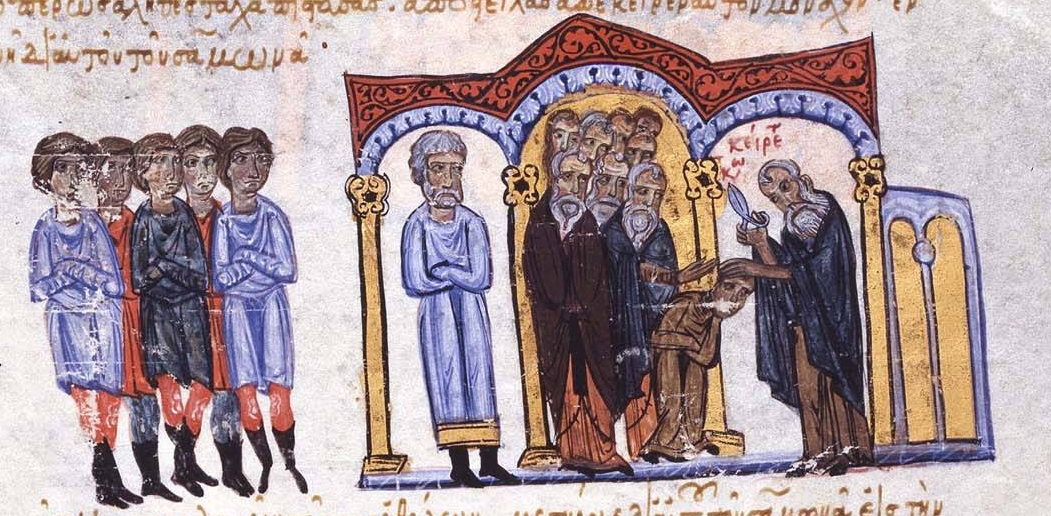
Constantine is tonsured at the Monastery of St. Tarasios at Samonas' orders. Miniature from the Madrid Skylitzes

In the same year, in a bid to ingratiate himself with Leo's fourth wife, Zoe Karbonopsina, Samonas presented her with Constantine as a gift. The imperial couple took an immediate liking to Constantine, so much that Samonas began to fear for his own influence and position. As a result, he tried to slander Constantine, claiming that he was having an affair with the empress. Leo initially believed the accusations, and had Constantine banished to the Monastery of St. Tarasios. Samonas himself performed Constantine's tonsure. Soon, however, Leo began to miss his new favourite. He had him moved to Samonas' own Speira Monastery, and during an "accidental" visit there, pardoned Constantine and took him with him back to the palace. Samonas then resorted to another scheme: with his secretary Constantine the Rhodian he produced a pamphlet, supposedly written by Constantine, which insulted the emperor, and arranged for Leo to read it. His machinations, however, were betrayed by one of his fellow conspirators, and Samonas was dismissed, tonsured, and banished to the monastery of Martinakios in summer of 908. Constantine succeeded him as imperial parakoimomenos. Leo gifted him with a monastery at Nosiai, which was inaugurated by the emperor and patriarch Euthymius in person.

== Dismissal and restoration under Empress-regent Zoe ==
Constantine remained the parakoimomenos until the Leo's death, but was apparently dismissed by Leo's brother and successor Alexander (r. 912–913), because the sources report that Empress Zoe recalled him to the position of parakoimomenos when she assumed the regency over her underage son Constantine VII (r. 913–959) in autumn 913. Constantine shortly after accused Theophylact, the newly appointed commander of the imperial bodyguard, the Hetaireia, of plotting to have his brother made emperor. Empress Zoe accordingly dismissed Theophylact. During the remainder of the regency of Zoe, Constantine played apparently a major role in the governance of the state. Two letters by Patriarch Nicholas Mystikos to Constantine (or a subordinate) show his involvement in the financial administration—specifically the exploitation of church property to the benefit of the state treasury—as well as the organization of games with animal fights to celebrate an alliance with the Pechenegs, an event which the Patriarch condemned as un-Christian, and for which he ordered Constantine and other leading officials to conduct a penance. At some point during this period (914–918), his sister died, and Nicholas Mystikos wrote him a letter of condolences. In the De Administrando Imperio, composed by Constantine VII in his later reign, Constantine Barbaros is dismissed as incompetent, and criticized for some of his decisions regarding promotions and appointments.

== Rivalry with Romanos Lekapenos and downfall ==
Following the series of military disasters in the ongoing war against Bulgaria, Zoe's regime was shaken, and the path to the throne was opened to ambitious military leaders: Constantine's brother-in-law Leo Phokas, and the commander of the Imperial Fleet, Romanos Lekapenos (eventually emperor in 920–944). Although both bore heavy responsibility for the defeats against Bulgaria, they controlled the only readily available military forces near Constantinople. According to the Byzantine chroniclers, in winter 918/919 (or winter 919/920, the date is disputed among scholars), Constantine engaged in machinations to secure the rise of Phokas to the throne. Urged by his tutor Theodore, the young Constantine VII then turned to Lekapenos for support. The latter initially hesitated, but eventually agreed. It is however possible that the story of Constantine's plotting was a later invention by the supporters of Lekapenos, to justify his actions leading to his eventual usurpation of the throne. Although the alliance between Lekapenos and the young emperor became known in the capital, Constantine disregarded it, so that when he ordered the fleet paid up and discharged, he was unconcerned enough to visit the ships in person, whereupon he was duly taken prisoner by Lekapenos' men. When the empress went to the harbour to enquire as to the reasons of her favourite's arrest, Theodore replied that Leo Phokas had ruined the state (through his failed leadership against the Bulgarians) and Constantine was ruining the palace. The bloodless coup was a success: Nicholas Mystikos was re-appointed as regent in place of Zoe, and his first step was to dismiss Leo Phokas from his post as Domestic of the Schools. As the Patriarch tried to curb the power of Lekapenos, however, on 25 March the admiral seized the Boukoleon harbour and forcibly removed the Patriarch from the palace. Constantine VII was ostensibly installed as sole ruler, but the power now lay with Lekapenos and his followers. Constantine Barbaros himself was allowed to keep his position for a while, but only after swearing fealty and writing letters to his brother-in-law urging him not to rebel against the emperor. This was in vain, as in October 920 Phokas rose in revolt. The sources report that the parakoimomenos supported his bid for the throne, but this seems unlikely, as he was not punished after the failure of Phokas' uprising.

== Later life ==
According to the Life of Basil the Younger, Constantine retained the rank of primikerios during the later half of the reign of Romanos Lekapenos (i.e. between 931 and 944), and was allowed to keep his palace near Arcadianae, built for him at imperial expense during his tenure as parakoimomenos. The hagiography reports that Constantine hosted Basil in the palace for several years until his death, giving him use of a portion of it as his residence, which he used to receive visits and perform healing miracles; and that there Basil became acquainted with several senior members of the court, including Emperor Romanos Lekapenos and Empress Helena Lekapene. Constantine was still alive when Basil died in 944 (or 952).

== Sources ==
- Lilie, Ralph-Johannes; Ludwig, Claudia; Pratsch, Thomas; Zielke, Beate (2013). Prosopographie der mittelbyzantinischen Zeit Online. Berlin-Brandenburgische Akademie der Wissenschaften. Nach Vorarbeiten F. Winkelmanns erstellt (in German). Berlin and Boston: De Gruyter.
- Ringrose, Kathryn M. (2003). The Perfect Servant: Eunuchs and the Social Construction of Gender in Byzantium. Chicago and London: University of Chicago Press. ISBN 978-0-226-72015-9.
- Runciman, Steven (1988) [1929]. The Emperor Romanus Lecapenus and His Reign: A Study of Tenth-Century Byzantium. Cambridge: Cambridge University Press. ISBN 0-521-35722-5.
- Tougher, Shaun (1997). The Reign of Leo VI (886–912): Politics and People. Leiden: Brill. ISBN 978-9-00-410811-0.

Court offices
Preceded by Samonas	Parakoimomenos of the Byzantine emperor 908–912	Succeeded by Barbatos
Preceded by Barbatos	Parakoimomenos of the Byzantine emperor 913–919	Unknown Title next held by Theophanes
