= Logothetes ton oikeiakon =

The logothetēs tōn oikeiakōn (Greek: λογοθέτης τῶν οἰκειακῶν), originally the epi tōn oikeiakōn (ὁ ἐπὶ τῶν οἰκειακῶν) was a Byzantine official with varying duties.

The oikeiakoi (from οἰκειακός, "belonging to the household") were a class of senior imperial household officials attested in the 9th and 10th centuries. The position of a head of this class (epi tōn oikeiakōn means "in charge of the oikeiakoi") appeared possibly in the 10th century, based on sigillographic evidence, or at any rate before circa 1030. His exact functions are unclear: Rodolphe Guilland considered him the successor of the epi tou eidikou as the head of the imperial private treasury, while Nicolas Oikonomides thought that he administered the Byzantine emperor's private domains. The post was often combined with other positions, and fulfilled a range of judicial and fiscal duties. In the Palaiologan period, it became the logothetēs tōn oikeiakōn, who exercised mainly diplomatic and judicial duties. According to the Book of Offices of pseudo-Kodinos, compiled around the middle of the 14th century, the logothetēs tōn oikeiakōn occupied the 39th place in the imperial hierarchy, between the praitōr tou dēmou and the megas logariastēs, but held no official function. His court uniform consisted of a turban (phakeōlis) and an overcoat called epilourikon.

== See also ==
- Protovestiarios

== Sources ==
- Guilland, Rodolphe (1971). "Les Logothètes: Etudes sur l'histoire administrative de l'Empire byzantin" [The Logothetes: Studies on the Administrative History of the Byzantine Empire]. Revue des études byzantines (in French). 29: 5–115. doi:10.3406/rebyz.1971.1441.
- Kazhdan, Alexander, ed. (1991). The Oxford Dictionary of Byzantium. Oxford and New York: Oxford University Press. ISBN 0-19-504652-8.
- Verpeaux, Jean, ed. (1966). Pseudo-Kodinos, Traité des Offices (in French). Centre National de la Recherche Scientifique.
