= Notarius =

Title of civilian or ecclesiastical official in Roman empire

A notarius is a public secretary who is appointed by competent authority to draw up official or authentic documents (compare English "notary"). In the Roman Catholic Church there have been apostolic notaries and even episcopal notaries. Documents drawn up by notarii are issued chiefly from the official administrative offices, the chanceries; secondly, from tribunals; lastly, others are drawn up at the request of individuals to authenticate their contracts or other acts.

== Overview ==
The title and office existed in the bureaucracy of the Christianised Roman Empire at the Imperial Court, where the college of imperial notaries were governed by a primicerius. From the usage in the Emperor's representative in the West, the Exarch of Ravenna, the post and title was applied in the increasingly complicated bureaucracy of the Papal curia in Rome. There were notarii attached to all the episcopal see, whence they passed into use in the royal chanceries. All these notarii were in minor orders.

As the ex officio head of the papal chancery, the primicerius of the notaries was an important personage. During a vacancy of the papal chair, he formed part of the interim government, and a letter in 640 is signed (the pope being elected but not yet consecrated) by one "Johannes, primicerius and serving in the place of the holy apostolic see".

There were formerly apostolic notaries and even apostolic prothonotaries commissioned by papal letters, whose duty it was to receive documents in connection with benefices, foundations, and donations in favor of churches, the wills of clerics and other affairs to which the ecclesiastical hierarchy was an interested party. The title no longer exists; the only ecclesiastical notaries at present are the officials of the Roman and episcopal curiae.

== Prothonotaries ==
Liber Pontificalis attributes the seven regional notaries of the Church in Rome, one for each ecclesiastical district of the Holy City, to an institution of Pope Clement I (traditionally 88–98), to record the acts of the martyrs; though this is unattested in any early document, the notice of Pope Julius I (337-352) in the Liber Pontificalis relates that this pope ordered an account of the property of the Church, intended as an authentic document, to be drawn up before the primicerius of the notaries. These important officials became the prothonotaries.

== See also ==
- Eschatocol
