= Nipsistiarios =

The nipsistiarios (Greek: νιψιστιάριος) was a Byzantine court position and rank reserved for eunuchs.

The office is first attested in a 7th-century seal, but was abandoned well before the 14th century, since it is not mentioned in the Book of Offices of pseudo-Kodinos. As his name shows (from Greek νίπτειν, "to wash hands"), the nipsistiarios was tasked with holding a gold, gem-encrusted water basin and assisting the Byzantine emperor in performing the ritual ablutions before he exited the imperial palace or performed ceremonies. According to the Klētorologion of 899, his insigne of office was a kamision (tunic) embroidered with the figure of a basin in purple. In the Klētorologion, he ranks as the lowest in the hierarchy of the specifically eunuch dignities, below the koubikoularios, but in the 10th century, there is a reference to the eunuch Samonas being promoted from koubikoularios to nipsistiarios.

== Sources ==
- Bury, J. B. (1911). The Imperial Administrative System of the Ninth Century – With a Revised Text of the Kletorologion of Philotheos. London: Oxford University Press. OCLC 1046639111.
- Kazhdan, Alexander (1991). "Nipsistiarios". In Kazhdan, Alexander (ed.). The Oxford Dictionary of Byzantium. Oxford and New York: Oxford University Press. p. 1488. ISBN 0-19-504652-8.
