= Constantine Doukas Nestongos =

13th-century Byzantine aristocrat

Constantine Doukas Nestongos (Greek: Κωνσταντῖνος ∆ούκας Νεστόγγος, fl. 1280–1307) was a Byzantine aristocrat and courtier.

Nestongos first appears in 1280, when he accompanied the co-emperor (and future sole emperor) Andronikos II Palaiologos in his campaign against the Turks in the Maeander River valley. Nestongos at the time held the position of parakoimomenos of the imperial seal. Appointed governor of Nyssa, he held the post until the city fell to the Turks in ca. 1284. Nestongos himself was captured, but had been released by June 1285, when he witnessed a treaty with the Republic of Venice.

He is last mentioned in ca. 1307, in a legal dispute between some of his tenants (paroikoi) near Smyrna with a local monastery. Some authors identify him with a "Doukas Nestongos" who was megas hetaireiarches in 1304, but this is unlikely since the latter post was much junior in rank to the parakoimomenos.

== Sources ==
- Trapp, Erich; Beyer, Hans-Veit; Walther, Rainer; Sturm-Schnabl, Katja; Kislinger, Ewald; Leontiadis, Ioannis; Kaplaneres, Sokrates (1976–1996). Prosopographisches Lexikon der Palaiologenzeit (in German). Vienna: Verlag der Österreichischen Akademie der Wissenschaften. ISBN 3-7001-3003-1.
