= John Phakrases =

John Phakrases (Greek: Ἱωάννης Φακρασῆς, fl. early 14th century) was a Byzantine nobleman and courtier.

Little is known about his life. His father, whose name is unknown, was logothetes ton agelon, and he was possibly the grandson of a namesake 13th-century official who was a friend and correspondent of Patriarch Gregory II of Constantinople. Of his career, it is only known that Phakrases served as parakoimomenos under Emperor Andronikos II Palaiologos (r. 1282–1328). Maximos Planoudes intended to teach him, and a manuscript names him as the author of a list of offices in verse. Phakrases was married and had children. Their names are unknown, as is that of his wife, on whose death Manuel Gabalas composed a funeral elegy.

== Sources ==
- Guilland, Rodolphe (1967). "Le Parakimomène". Recherches sur les institutions byzantines [Studies on the Byzantine Institutions]. Berliner byzantinische Arbeiten 35 (in French). Vol. I. Berlin and Amsterdam: Akademie-Verlag & Adolf M. Hakkert. pp. 202–215. OCLC 878894516.
- Trapp, Erich; Beyer, Hans-Veit; Walther, Rainer; Sturm-Schnabl, Katja; Kislinger, Ewald; Leontiadis, Ioannis; Kaplaneres, Sokrates (1976–1996). Prosopographisches Lexikon der Palaiologenzeit (in German). Vienna: Verlag der Österreichischen Akademie der Wissenschaften. ISBN 3-7001-3003-1.
