= Ostiarios =

Ostiarios (Greek: ὀστιάριος, from the Latin ostiarius, "doorkeeper, usher") was a Byzantine court dignity reserved for eunuch palace officials.

== History and functions ==
The Patria of Constantinople mention an ostiarios named Antiochos in the 6th century at the time of Emperor Justinian I (r. 527–565), and a 7th-century seal records an ostiarios and koubikoularios (servant of the imperial bedchamber). As a pure dignity, to be held alongside proper offices, the ostiarios is first recorded in historical sources for the year 787. By this time, the title seems to have become firmly established as a dignity, although there is still mention of it being an active function, such as in Philotheos's Kletorologion of 899 of an "imperial ostiarios" performing the duties of an usher.

The dignity was an awarded title (διὰ βραβείου ἀξία, dia brabeiou axia), with a gold band with a jewelled handle as its characteristic insigne, whose award (βραβείον, brabeion) also conferred the dignity. It was the fourth-lowest dignity for eunuchs, above the spatharokoubikoularios and below the primikerios, and was reserved specifically for them. It was most frequently awarded to mid-level civil functionaries, such as the protonotarioi.

The dignity is last mentioned in 1086. Nicolas Oikonomides concludes that it must have disappeared by the end of the 11th century, although another ostiarios is mentioned in 1174 and some seals have been dated to the 12th and possibly even the 13th century.

== Sources ==
- Bury, J. B. (1911). The Imperial Administrative System of the Ninth Century – With a Revised Text of the Kletorologion of Philotheos. London: Oxford University Press. OCLC 1046639111.
- Guilland, Rodolphe (1967). "L'Ostiaire (ὀστιάριος)". Recherches sur les institutions byzantines, Tome I (in French). Berlin: Akademie-Verlag. pp. 286–299.
- Kazhdan, Alexander, ed. (1991). The Oxford Dictionary of Byzantium. Oxford and New York: Oxford University Press. ISBN 0-19-504652-8.
- Oikonomides, Nicolas (1972). Les listes de préséance byzantines des IXe et Xe siècles (in French). Paris: Editions du Centre National de la Recherche Scientifique.
