= Lex Cornelia de sicariis et veneficis =

Ancient Roman statute

The Lex Cornelia de sicariis et veneficis (or veneficiis) (The Cornelian Law against Murderers and Poisoners) was a Roman statute enacted by Lucius Cornelius Sulla in 81 BC during his dictatorship to write laws and reconstitute the state (legibus scribundis et rei publicae constituendae) which aimed at the punishment of murderers, poisoners, abortionists, human sacrifice, and malign magicians and was later also applied to the punishment of castration and circumcision. It was still in force in the time of Justinian in the 6th century A.D.

The provisions of the law were described by the later Roman jurist Paul as including:

- Suppliers of love potions or abortifacients to be relegated to the mines if lower class (humiliores), banished to an island if upper class (honestiores), or executed if the potion results in death.
- Those who perform bewitching or binding spells to be crucified or thrown to the beasts.
- Those who engage in human sacrifice or make offerings of human blood in temples to be thrown to the beasts if lower class, executed if upper class.
- Practitioners of magic to be thrown to the beasts or crucified. A professional "magus" to be burned alive.
- Possessors of magical books (libri artis magicae) to have their property confiscated and the books publicly burned, if upper class then exiled, if lower class executed.
- Suppliers of drugs given as cures that result in death to be executed if lower class, banished to an island if upper class.

The law significantly moved to replace the traditional Roman penalty of the Poena cullei for poisoners and practitioners of malign magic, which involved being sewn up in a sack and thrown into the river, with more standard punishments. The original maximum penalty mandated for convicted citizens may have been banishment to an island and confiscation of property, but by the later empire the imposition of capital punishment in its various forms, with distinction between honestiores and humiliores, had become standard. The law further not only punished the poisoner but also equally, if distinct, the suppliers and manufacturers of the potion which had induced the death. The concern of the provisions against suppliers of abortifacients seems to be safeguarding the life of the mother, for whose murder or endangerment the supplier would be charged, not the foetus.

The penalties of the Lex Cornelia de sicariis et veneficis were imposed by Hadrian on castrators, already generally banned by Domitian, and by edict of Antoninus Pius on all who performed circumcision on males, with special exemption for the Jews.
