= Cubicularius =

Eunuch chamberlain in the Roman Empire

Cubicularius, Hellenized as koubikoularios (Greek: κουβικουλάριος), was a title used for the eunuch chamberlains of the imperial palace in the later Roman Empire and in the Byzantine Empire. The feminine version, used for the ladies-in-waiting of the empresses, was koubikoularia (κουβικουλαρία).

== History ==
The term derives from their service in the sacrum cubiculum, the emperor's "sacred bedchamber". In the late Roman period, the cubicularii or koubikoularioi were numerous: according to John Malalas, Empress Theodora's retinue numbered as many as 4,000 patrikioi and koubikoularioi. They were placed under the command of the praepositus sacri cubiculi and the primicerius sacri cubiculi, while the other palace servants came either under the castrensis sacri palatii or the magister officiorum. There were also special cubicularii/koubikoularioi for the empress (sometimes including female koubikoulariai), and the office was introduced into the Roman Church as well, probably under Pope Leo I.

In Byzantium, they played a very important role, holding senior palace offices such as parakoimōmenos or the epi tēs trapezēs, but also served in posts in the central financial departments, as provincial administrators and sometimes even as generals. Gradually, in the 7th-8th centuries, the eunuchs of the imperial bedchamber proper (in Greek known as the [βασιλικὸς] κοιτῶν, [basilikos] koitōn) were separated from the other koubikoularioi and, distinguished as the koitōnitai (κοιτωνῖται), came under the authority of the parakoimōmenos. At the same time, the imperial wardrobe (basilikon vestiarion) and its officials also became a separate department under the prōtovestiarios. The remainder continued as the "koubikoularioi of the kouboukleion" (κουβικουλάριοι τοῦ κουβουκλείου), still under the praepositus (Greek: πραιπόσιτος τοῦ εὐσεβεστάτου κοιτῶνος, praipositos tou eusebestatou koitōnos in Greek), with the primicerius (πριμηκήριος τοῦ κουβουκλείου, primikērios tou kouboukleiou) continuing as his chief aide. The office was eventually abandoned by the Byzantines, but it is not clear when: Nikolaos Oikonomides suggested the latter half of the 11th century, but Rodolphe Guilland supported its continued existence until the early 13th century.

By the 9th century, aside from its general use denoting a eunuch palace servant, koubikoularios had also acquired a more technical meaning as a grade or dignity in the Byzantine palace hierarchy: according to the Klētorologion of 899, the rank of koubikoularios was the second-lowest among those reserved for the eunuchs, coming after the spatharokoubikoularios and before the nipsistiarios. Again according to the Klētorologion, the distinctive insignia of the rank were a kamision (an over-cape similar to the paenula) edged with purple, and a paragaudion (tunic).

== See also ==
- Exoletus

== Sources ==
- Bury, J. B.; Philotheus (1911). The Imperial Administrative System of the Ninth Century (With a Revised Text of the Kletorologion of Philotheos). London: Oxford University Press.
- Kazhdan, Alexander (1991). "Koubikoularios". In Kazhdan, Alexander (ed.). The Oxford Dictionary of Byzantium. Oxford and New York: Oxford University Press. p. 1154. ISBN 0-19-504652-8.
