= Epi tou eidikou =

Official in the Byzantine Empire

The epi tou eidikou (Greek: ἐπὶ τοῦ εἰδικοῦ [λόγου], lit. 'in charge of the special [department]'), also known simply as the [e]idikos, meaning 'Special Secretary', or, from the 11th century on, as the logothetes tou eidikou, was an official of the Byzantine Empire who controlled the department known as eidikon, a special treasury and storehouse.

== History and functions ==
The origin of the office is disputed: the department is first attested in the reign of Emperor Theophilos (r. 829–842), but some scholars (e.g. Rodolphe Guilland) derive the etymology of the eidikon department from the word idikos, lit. 'private', indicating a continuation of the Late Roman office of comes rerum privatarum. This view is rejected by others, notably J. B. Bury, who see it as a wholly separate institution, juxtaposing the 'special' department of the eidikon with the 'general' department or genikon, and consider it as originating in the military departments of the Late Roman praetorian prefectures. Ernst Stein, on the other hand, connected it to the word eidos (meaning 'ware'), and regarded the eidikon as the treasury for revenue paid in kind rather than coin.

The eidikon fulfilled the dual function of imperial treasury and storehouse. As a treasury, it stored various precious materials such as silk or gold, and was responsible for the payment of the annual salaries (rogai) of officials of senatorial rank. As a storehouse, the eidikon controlled the state factories producing military equipment (the Late Roman fabricae) and was responsible for supplying the necessary matériel for expeditions, ranging from weapons to "sails, ropes, hides, axes, wax, tin, lead, casks" for the fleet or even Arab clothing for imperial spies. For expeditions in which the emperor himself took part, the eidikos accompanied the army at the head of his own baggage train of 46 pack-horses carrying everything "from shoes to candlesticks", as well as large sums of gold and silver coinage for the emperor's use.

The department is still attested as late as 1081, but was probably abolished some time after; Rodolphe Guilland suggested that the logothesion of the oikeiakoi ('household men') took over its functions (cf. logothetes ton oikeiakon).

== Staff ==
As with all Byzantine department heads, the eidikos had a number of subordinate officials:

- The basilikoi notarioi (βασιλικοί νοτάριοι, 'imperial notaries'), as in all fiscal departments, usually of spatharios rank or lower; a protonotarios ('first notary') is attested at their head in the Komnenian period (1081–1185).
- The archontes ton ergodosion (ἄρχοντες τῶν ἐργοδοσίων, 'masters of the factories') and meizoteroi ton ergodosion (μειζότεροι τῶν ἐργοδοσίων ,'overseers/foremen of the factories'). As their name indicates, they supervised individual state factories for silk, jewelry, weapons, etc. They are well attested in seals from the 7th century on, and from the 9th century on they are frequently called kouratores.
- The hebdomadarioi tou eidikou (ἑβδομαδάριοι τοῦ εἰδικοῦ), palace servants.

The seat of the eidikon was in a special building within the Great Palace of Constantinople, which tradition ascribed to Constantine the Great (r. 306–337). It was situated between the great halls of the Triconchos and the Lausiakos, near the imperial audience hall of the Chrysotriklinos.

== Sources ==
- Bury, John Bagnell (1911). The Imperial Administrative System of the Ninth Century - With a Revised Text of the Kletorologion of Philotheos. London: Oxford University Press.
- Guilland, Rodolphe (1971). "Les Logothètes: Etudes sur l'histoire administrative de l'Empire byzantin". Revue des études byzantines (in French). 29 (29): 5–115. doi:10.3406/rebyz.1971.1441.
- Kazhdan, Alexander, ed. (1991). The Oxford Dictionary of Byzantium. Oxford and New York: Oxford University Press. ISBN 0-19-504652-8.
- Louth, Andrew (2005). "The Byzantine Empire in the Seventh Century". In Fouracre, Paul (ed.). The New Cambridge Medieval History, Volume 1, c.500–c.700. Cambridge: Cambridge University Press. ISBN 978-1-13905393-8.
