= Metropolis of Miletus =

The Metropolis of Miletus (Greek: Μητρόπολις Μιλήτου) was an ecclesiastical diocese of the Ecumenical Patriarchate of Constantinople in southwestern Asia Minor, modern Turkey. The see of Miletus is attested since the 4th century, was raised to an archbishopric by the mid-6th century, and became a metropolitan see in the 12th century. The metropolis remained active until 1369.

== History ==
The see is attested since the early 4th century, when the Bishop of Miletus attended the First Council of Nicaea (325). In the 5th century it may have also been the seat of an Arian diocese. By 538, it had been raised to an autocephalous archdiocese. It ranked 6th to 15th among the archdioceses of the Patriarchate of Constantinople in the middle Byzantine period (7th–12th centuries) according to the various Notitiae Episcopatuum. Probably in the early 12th century—certainly by 1166—it had been raised further to the status of a metropolis (ranking 81st to 101st or 102nd in the Palaiologan period). In the 13th century, it was also referred to as Palatia, after the local Byzantine fortress of Ephesus. The see remained active until 1369, when it ceased activity due to the upheavals of the Ottoman conquest of the region. It was thereafter awarded as a titular diocese to the metropolitans of Aphrodisias.

== Bishops ==
According to E. Ragia:

- Kaisarios Eusebios (325), present at the First Ecumenical Council (1st Nicaea)
- Ambrakios (343/4)
- Hyakinthos (536–538)
- John (6th century)
- George (ca. 681–692), present at the Sixth Ecumenical Council (3rd Constantinople) and the Quinisext Council
- Epiphanios (787), present at the Seventh Ecumenical Council (2nd Nicaea)
- Peter (843, 847)
- Ignatios (879)
- Sophronios (9th century)
- Nikephoros (965–969?)
- Michael (10th/12th centuries)
- Niketas (?–1170)
- Nikephoros (1170–?)
- Niketas (1172)
- Nikephoros (?–1256)
- Nikandros (1256–?)
- Nilos (1365–1369)

== Sources ==
- Le Quien, Michel (1740). "Ecclesia Mileti". Oriens Christianus, in quatuor Patriarchatus digestus: quo exhibentur ecclesiæ, patriarchæ, cæterique præsules totius Orientis. Tomus primus: tres magnas complectens diœceses Ponti, Asiæ & Thraciæ, Patriarchatui Constantinopolitano subjectas (in Latin). Paris: Ex Typographia Regia. cols. 917–920. OCLC 955922585.
