= Primicerius =

Ancient Roman title

The Latin term primicerius, Hellenized as primikērios (Greek: πριμικήριος), was a title applied in the later Roman Empire and the Byzantine Empire to the heads of administrative departments, and also used by the Church to denote the heads of various colleges.

Etymologically the term derives from primus in cera, which is to say in tabula cerata, the first name in a list of a class of officials, which was usually inscribed on a waxed tablet.

== Civil and military ==
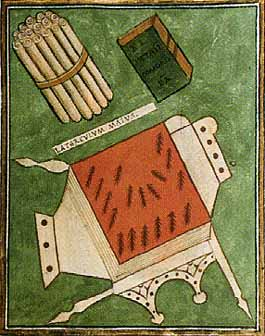
The items of office of the late Roman primicerius notariorum, as depicted in the Notitia Dignitatum.

From their origin in the court of the Dominate, there were several primicerii (primikērioi in Greek, from the 12th century usually spelled primmikērioi). In the court, there was the primicerius sacri cubiculi (in Byzantine times the primikērios of the kouboukleion), in charge of the emperor's bedchamber, almost always a eunuch. The title was also given to court officials in combination with other offices connected to the imperial person, such as the special treasury (eidikon) or the imperial wardrobe (vestiarion). Other primicerii headed some of the scrinia (departments) of the palace, chiefly the notarii or primicerius notariorum (notarioi or taboularioi in Byzantine sources).

In the Late Roman army, the primicerius was a rank junior to the tribunus and senior to the senator. They are best attested in units associated with the imperial court, chiefly imperial guards. Thus in the 4th to 6th centuries there were the primicerii of the protectores domestici and of the Scholae Palatinae, but also primicerii in charge of the armament factories (fabricae), which, like the Scholae, where under the jurisdiction of the magister officiorum. Primicerii are also to be found in the staffs of regional military commanders (duces), as well as in some regular military units. In the later Byzantine era, under the Komnenian emperors, primikērioi appear as commanders in the palace regiments of the Manglabitai, Vardariōtai, Vestiaritai and the Varangians.

In the late 11th century, the dignity of megas prim[m]ikērios ("Grand Primicerius") was established, which ranked very high in court hierarchy well into the Palaiologan period, where he functioned as a chief of ceremonies. Prim[m]ikērioi continue to be in evidence in the Byzantine Empire and the Despotate of Morea until their fall to the Ottomans.

== Ecclesiastical use ==
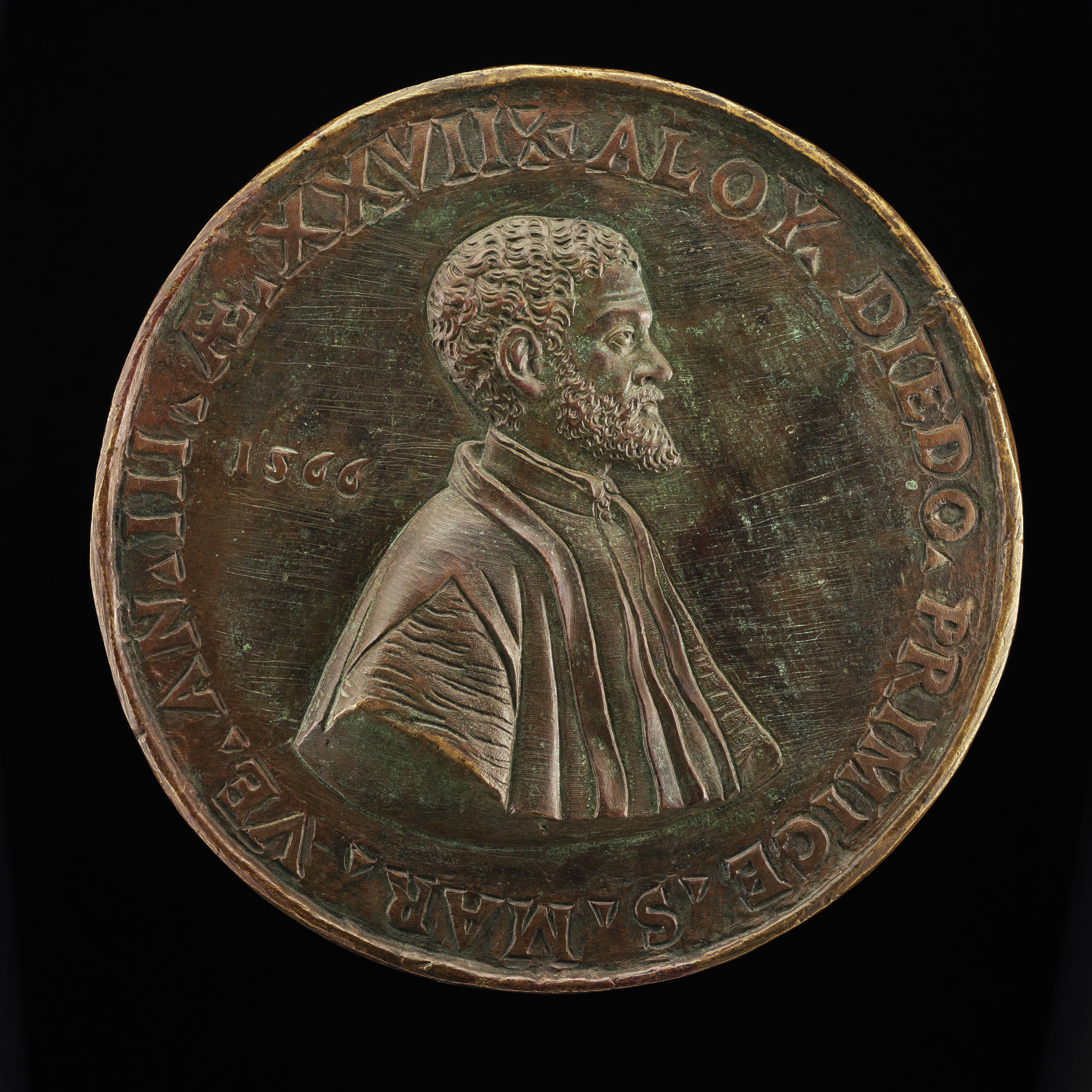
Medal depicting Alvise Diedo, primicerius of St Mark's Basilica, 1563

In ecclesiastical use the term was given to heads of the colleges of Notarii and Defensores, which occupied an important place in the administration of the Roman Church in Late Antiquity and in the Early Middle Ages.

When young clerics were assembled in schools for training in the ecclesiastical service in the different districts of the Western Church (from the fifth or sixth century), the directors of these schools were also given this title. Thus, an inscription of the year 551 from Lyon mentions a "Stephanus primicerius scolae lectorum servientium in ecclesia Lugdunensi". Isidore of Seville treats of the obligations of the primicerius of the lower clerics in his "Epistola ad Ludefredum". From this position the primicerius also derived certain powers in the direction of liturgical functions.

In the regulation of the common life of the clergy in collegiate and cathedral churches, according to the Rule of Chrodegang and the statutes of Amalarius of Metz, the primicerius appears as the first capitular after the archdeacon and archpresbyter, controlling the lower clerics and directing the liturgical functions and chant. The primicerius thus became a special dignitary of many chapters by a gradual development from the position of the old primicerius of the scola cantorum or lectorum.

In the Eastern Orthodox Church, the title was used for the heads of the colleges of the notarioi and taboularioi in the Church bureaucracy, but also for the chief lectors, cantors, etc. of a church.

In modern usage of the Russian Orthodox Church, the word primicerius (primikirii) is reserved for a junior cleric (sometimes a reader or subdeacon) holding a torch or a candle before an officiating bishop during the divine service; usually he goes ahead in different pontifical processions, which may be an explanation for the choice of this word (the second part of which in this case corresponds not to "wax (of a tablet)" but to "candle wax").

== General and cited references ==
- Le Blant, "Inscriptions chrétiennes de la Gaule", I, 142, n. 45
- Charles du Fresne, sieur du Cange, "Glossarium"
- Gregory of Tours, "Hist. Francorum", II, xxxvii
- St. Isidore of Seville, "Epistola ad Ludefredum", P.L., LXXXIII, 896

Attribution
