= Parakoimomenos =

Byzantine court position, usually reserved for eunuchs

The parakoimōmenos (Greek: παρακοιμώμενος, literally "the one who sleeps beside [the emperor's chamber]") was a Byzantine court position, usually reserved for eunuchs. The position's proximity to the emperors guaranteed its holders influence and power, and many of them, especially in the 9th and 10th centuries, functioned as the Byzantine Empire's chief ministers.

== History and functions ==
The title was used anachronistically by various Byzantine writers for prominent eunuch court officials of the distant past, including Euphratas under Constantine the Great (reigned 306–337), the notorious Chrysaphius under Theodosius II (r. 408–450), or an unnamed holder of the office under Emperor Maurice (r. 582–602). The position was probably created no later than the reign of Leo IV the Khazar (r. 775–780), when the chronicler Theophanes the Confessor mentions a "koubikoularios and parakoimomenos” serving Leo. In the beginning, it was a modest office, given to those koubikoularioi (from Latin cubicularius, denoting the eunuch servants of the emperor's "sacred bedchamber" or sacrum cubiculum) who were tasked with sleeping outside the emperor's chamber during the night as a security measure. As evidenced by seals from the 7th and 8th centuries, it was usually combined with other palace functions, such as the epi tēs trapezēs, and awarded lowly dignities such as ostiarios. It is possible that in the cases where several co-emperors reigned at the same time, a parakoimōmenos would be assigned to each.

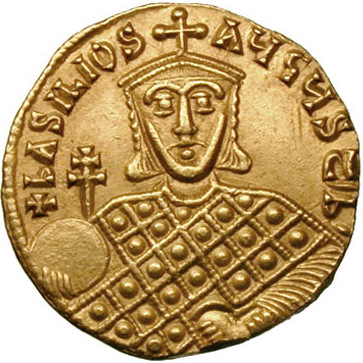
Gold solidus of Basil I the Macedonian

From the mid-9th century, however, the office grew in importance, outstripping its nominal superior, the praipositos, until it came to be regarded as the highest post reserved for eunuchs, with its holders raised to the dignity of patrikios. Over the next two centuries, many of its holders were able to use their proximity to the imperial person to exercise considerable political influence. Some of these men, exceptionally, were not eunuchs. During the reigns of weak or uninterested emperors, holders of the title parakoimōmenos, such as Samonas, Joseph Bringas and Basil Lekapenos, functioned as chief ministers, while Basil the Macedonian (r. 867–886) was able to use this position to eventually usurp the throne from Michael III (r. 842–867).

By the 11th century, the parakoimōmenos had assumed most of the old administrative functions of the praipositos as well. The post continued to be important in the 11th century, but seems to have declined in the 12th, when it also began to be regularly awarded—possibly as a noble title rather than an active function—to non-eunuchs as well. The post survived in the Empire of Nicaea (1204–1261) and into the Palaiologan period, where it was divided in two: the parakoimōmenos tēs sphendonēs (παρακοιμώμενος τῆς σφενδόνης) and the parakoimōmenos tou koitōnos (παρακοιμώμενος τοῦ κοιτῶνος). The parakoimōmenos tou koitōnos retained the duties of supervising the koitōn (the imperial bedchamber), assisted by the prokathēmenos tou koitōnos (προκαθήμενος τοῡ κοιτῶνος) and commanding the chamberlains (κοιτωνάριοι, koitōnarioi) and pages (παιδόπουλοι, paidopouloi), while the parakoimōmenos tēs sphendonēs who was entrusted with keeping the sphendonē, the ring with the emperor's personal seal, used to seal his private correspondence to his family. In the absence of the prōtostratōr, they were also charged with carrying the emperor's sword. At the same time, their holders ceased to be palace eunuchs, but were important noblemen and administrators; by the 14th century, the title of parakoimōmenos became essentially an honorific dignity.

The two posts ranked 16th and 17th respectively in the imperial hierarchy, according to the mid-14th century author pseudo-Kodinos, between the kouropalatēs and the logothetēs tou genikou. Their court costume consisted of a silk kabbadion tunic, and a gold-embroidered skiadion hat, or a domed skaranikon covered in apricot-coloured silk with gold-wire decorations. It bore in front a glass image of the emperor standing in front, and in the rear a similar image of him enthroned. The parakoimōmenos tēs sphendonēs was distinguished by his staff of office (dikanikion), which was of wood, with the topmost knob gilded, the next one covered in white-golden braid, the next again gilded, etc. The dikanikion of the parakoimōmenos tou koitōnos was similar, except that only the topmost knob was gilded, the others being all covered in white-golden braid.

== Known parakoimōmenoi ==
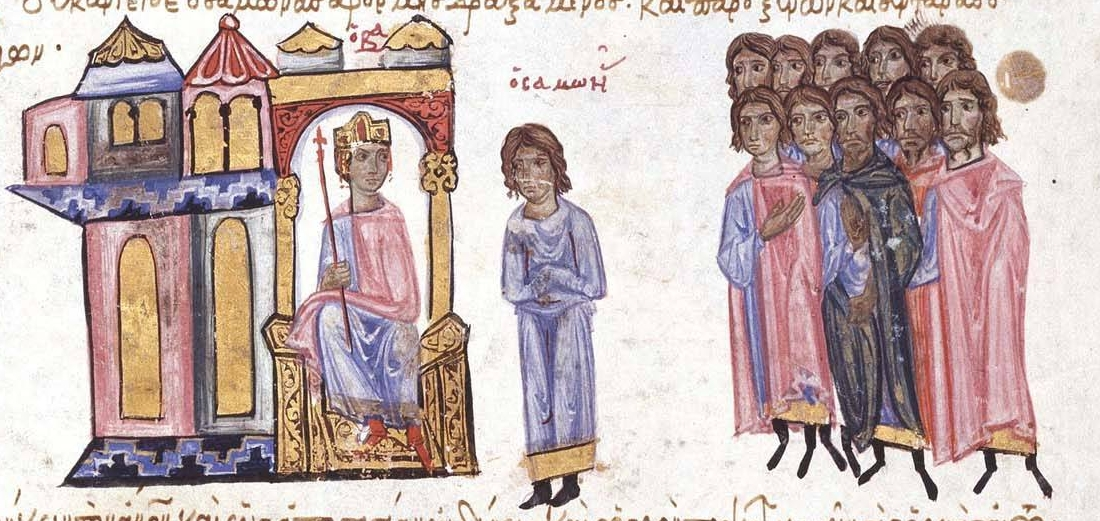
Miniature from the Madrid Skylitzes, showing Samonas inciting Emperor Leo VI against Andronikos Doukas

A number of seals mention a Theophylact, koubikoularios, parakoimomenos, and strategos of Sicily; he may be identical to the exarch Theophylact, attested in 701. This would make Theophylact the first known holder. The first secure mention in the sources occurs, as mentioned above, in the chronicle of Theophanes the Confessor, where the koubikoularios and parakoimomenos Theophanes was among those members of the court dismissed for their iconodule sympathies under Leo IV. The next holder, the ostiarios Scholastikios, is only known under Theophilos (r. 829–842). The patrikios Damian served Michael III until circa 865, and was then replaced by Michael's favourite, Basil the Macedonian. After Basil's accession to co-emperor in 866, the office was occupied by a certain Rentakios until the murder of Michael III. Judging from his own experience that the office was too powerful and too close to the emperor, Basil I (r. 867–886) did not appoint a parakoimōmenos. His son and successor Leo VI (r. 886–912) revived the office in 907 for his favourite Samonas, who until then was a prōtovestiarios. He held the post until his disgrace in summer 908. He was replaced by Constantine Barbaros, who held the office until circa 919 with the exception of the reign of Alexander (r. 912–913), who installed the patrikios Barbatos in his stead. Romanos I Lekapenos (r. 920–944) named his trusted aide Theophanes as parakoimōmenos.

Theophanes was retained by Constantine VII (r. 913–959) until 947, when he was replaced by Basil Lekapenos. Lekapenos, the bastard son of Emperor Romanos I, would play a dominant role in Byzantine history over the next four decades, toppling emperors and serving as the virtual regent or co-regent (paradynasteuōn) of the Empire for over thirty years, comprising the reigns of Nikephoros II Phokas (r. 963–969) and John I Tzimiskes (r. 969–976), and the early reign of Basil II (r. 976–1025) until his dismissal in 985. Basil was replaced under Romanos II (r. 959–963) by the capable Joseph Bringas, who also exercised the de facto rule of the state, but was toppled by Lekapenos shortly after Romanos II's death.

In the 11th century, the most important holder of the office was Nicholas, who was parakoimōmenos and proedros as well as Domestic of the Schools under Constantine VIII (r. 1025–1028) and served again in the same offices for a time under Constantine IX Monomachos (r. 1042–1055). John Komnenos, a relative of the Emperor John II Komnenos (r. 1118–1143), was named as parakoimōmenos and entrusted with the charge of state affairs along with Gregory Taronites. In the late 12th century, the eunuch Nikephoros under Andronikos I Komnenos (r. 1183–1185) and the likewise eunuch John Oinopolites under Alexios III Angelos (r. 1195–1203) are the only known holders.

In the Empire of Nicaea, known holders are the pansebastos sebastos Alexios Krateros (attested circa 1227–1231, in tandem with the post of apographeus) under John III Vatatzes (r. 1222–1254), and the prōtovestiaritēs George Zagarommates, who was promoted to parakoimōmenos by Theodore II Laskaris (r. 1254–1258) but was soon disgraced. He eventually rose to panhypersebastos under Michael VIII Palaiologos (r. 1259–1282). An otherwise unidentified pansebastos and parakoimōmenos John also appears to belong to the middle of the 13th century.

Michael VIII Palaiologos named a trusted agent of his, a defector from the Seljuk court named Basil Basilikos, to serve as parakoimōmenos of the koitōn during his early reign (1259–1261). After becoming sole emperor in 1261, Michael named John Makrenos to the post. Makrenos participated in the campaign to recover the Morea from the Latins, and fought in the battles of Prinitza and Makryplagi, being captured in the latter. He was later returned to Constantinople, where he was accused of treason and blinded. Three parakoimōmenoi of the sphendonē are known under Michael VIII: the pansebastos sebastos Isaac Doukas, brother of John III Vatatzes, who was present at the signature of the Treaty of Nymphaeum and died as an envoy in Genoa; Gabriel Sphrantzes (a nephew of John I Doukas, ruler of Thessaly); and Constantine Doukas Nestongos. Nestongos was closely associated with Andronikos II Palaiologos (r. 1282–1328), accompanying him on his first expedition against the Aydinid Turks in 1280. He retained his position at least during the early years of Andronikos II's reign.

Apart from Nestongos, the following parakoimōmenoi are known under Andronikos II Palaiologos: Dionysios Drimys, mentioned in a poem of Manuel Philes ca. 1300; Andronikos Kantakouzenos in ca. 1320; Andronikos Komnenos Doukas Palaiologos Tornikes, a grandson of Michael VIII's half-brother Constantine Palaiologos, who held the post in ca. 1324–1327; John Phakrases, author of a treatise in verse on imperial offices; and the general John Choumnos, the eldest son of the scholar and minister Nikephoros Choumnos, who was promoted from parakoimōmenos tou koitōnos to parakoimōmenos tēs sphendonēs in 1307. An unnamed member of the Raoul family, mentioned by Manuel Philes, also held the post at about the same time.

Perhaps the most famous of the late Byzantine parakoimōmenoi was the capable and ambitious Alexios Apokaukos, a man of humble birth who rose in high office as a protégé of John Kantakouzenos and the chief instigator of the Byzantine civil war of 1341–1347. He was made parakoimōmenos in 1321, and held the post until his elevation to the rank of megas doux in 1341. Finally, the last known holders are Demetrios, "uncle" of the Emperor John V Palaiologos (r. 1341–1391), attested at Constantinople in 1342; Manuel Sergopoulos, named "parakoimōmenos of the great sphendonē" by John VI Kantakouzenos (r. 1347–1354) and given the lordship of Marmara Island for life by the same emperor; the physician Angelos Kalothetos, attested at Mystras in a letter in 1362, and the katholikos kritēs Theophylaktos Dermokaites, who was sent as en emissary to Pope Urban V in October 1367.

Only one parakoimōmenos is known for the Empire of Trebizond (1204–1461), Michael Sampson, who is attested in 1432.
