= Samonas =

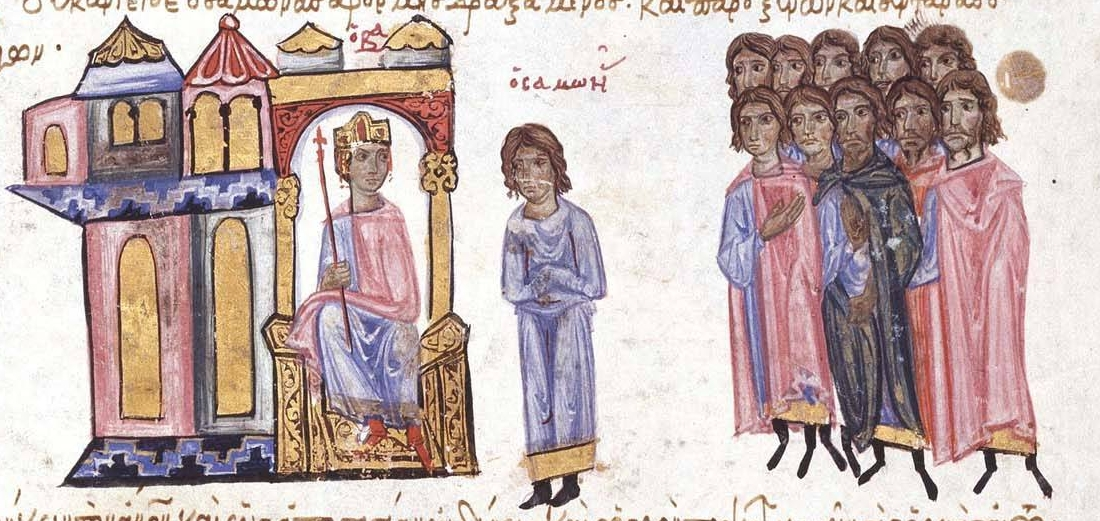
- Samonas inciting Emperor Leo against Andronikos Doukas

Patrikios
- Parakoimomenos; 907–908
- Preceded by: Basil the Macedonian (under Michael III)
- Succeeded by: Constantine Barbaros
- Protovestiarios; 904–907
- Monarch: Leo VI the Wise

Protospatharios
- In office 900–904
- Monarch: Leo VI

Koubikoularios
- In office 899–900
- Monarch: Leo VI

Personal details
- Born: c. 875
- Died: after 908

Samonas (Greek: Σαμῶνας, c. 875 – after 908) was an Arab eunuch, who was captured by the Byzantines and became one of the most influential officials of the Byzantine Empire during the first decade of the 10th century.

== Biography ==
Samonas was born in circa 875 in Melitene, apparently the son of a distinguished family (his father would later serve as ambassador to Byzantium in 908). Captured by the Byzantines, he was made a eunuch and entered service in the household of Stylianos Zaoutzes, the powerful chief minister and father-in-law of Emperor Leo VI the Wise (r. 886–912). After the death of both Stylianos and his daughter, the Empress Zoe Zaoutzaina, in 899, his relatives plotted to overthrow Leo in a bid to preserve their power and influence. Their conspiracy, however, was betrayed by Samonas to Leo: the members of the Zaoutzes clan were deprived of their titles and wealth and exiled, but Samonas was rewarded by receiving one third of their fortune and being taken into imperial service as koubikoularios.

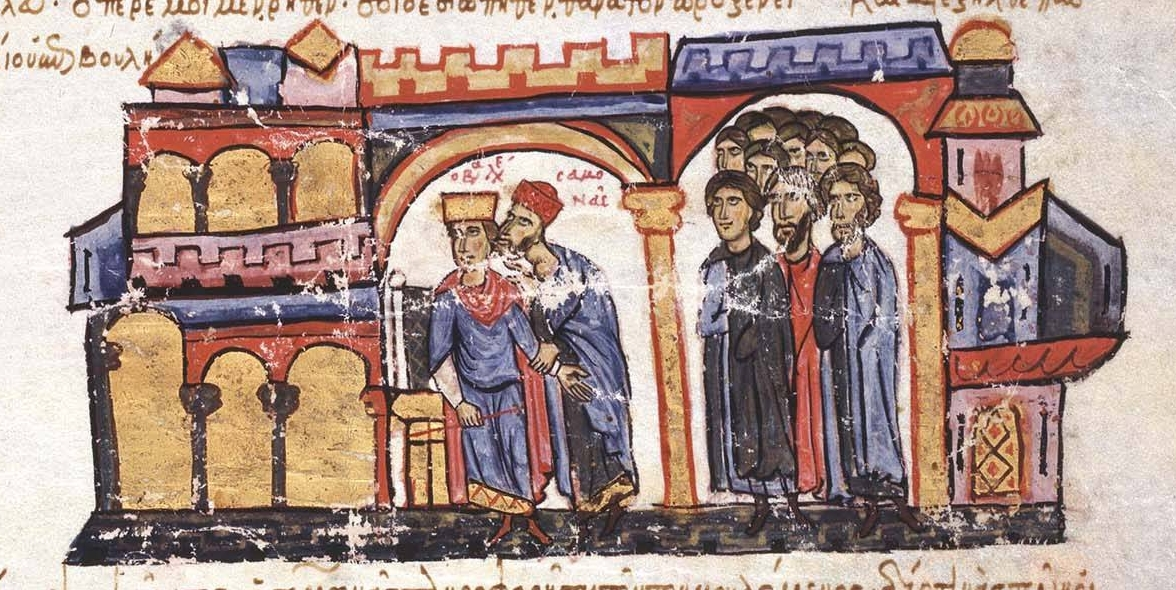
Samonas informs the Emperor Leo of a plot to kill him.

Promoted rapidly after his entry into Leo's personal service, he was made a protospatharios in 900. By 903, he had apparently become, in the words of Shaun Tougher, "Leo's trusted right-hand man". He seems to have been particularly involved in security and intelligence issues, a role stressed by several scholars who have dealt with his life. In 904, however, Samonas was involved in a bizarre episode: on the pretext of visiting a monastery, he escaped Constantinople and made for the East, hoping apparently to reach his native lands. He was, however, prevented from crossing the Halys River, and sought refuge in the monastery of the Holy Cross at Siricha. There, he was in the end captured by Constantine Doukas, and brought to trial before the Byzantine Senate. Although he was not acquitted, the emperor's continued favour meant that he was only mildly punished by four months of house arrest.

As soon as he was released, Samonas's career resumed its upward path: named patrikios, the highest court rank open to a eunuch, he was made protovestiarios. Another unusual mark of imperial favour occurred in 906, when Samonas was made godfather to Leo's son and heir, Constantine. In 906–907, he played an important but shadowy role in the disgrace, defection, and eventual deaths of the generals Andronikos Doukas (the father of Constantine Doukas who had arrested Samonas in 904) and Eustathios Argyros. At the same time, throughout the prolonged confrontation of Leo with the Patriarch of Constantinople Nicholas Mystikos over the emperor's tetragamy, Samonas was the chief supporter of Leo. As a token of gratitude, probably after the deposition of Mystikos in early 907, he was promoted to the supreme eunuch post of parakoimomenos, which had lain vacant since the end of the reign of Michael III (r. 842–867).

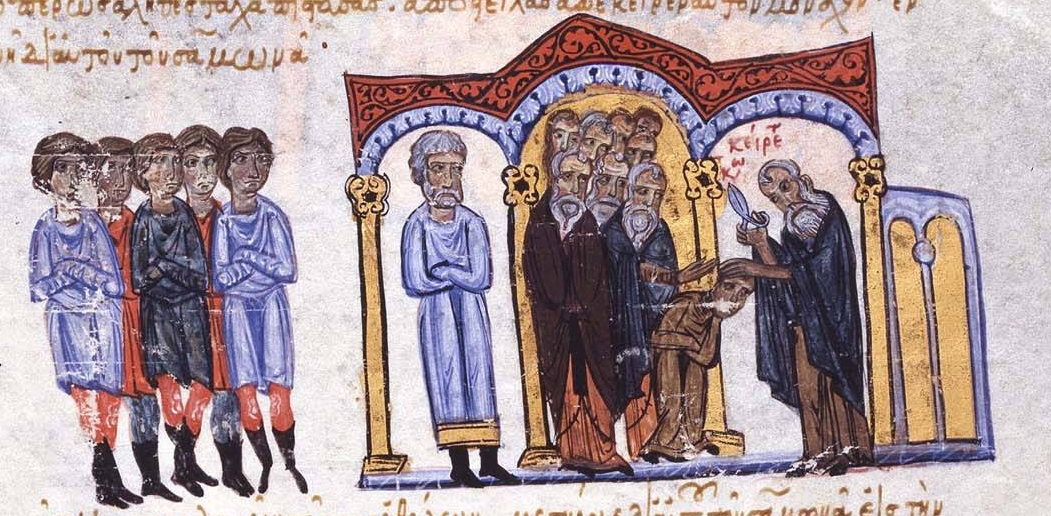
Constantine the Paphlagonian is tonsured at the orders of Samonas, miniature from the Madrid Skylitzes

Samonas's own downfall, however, would come soon after. In 907, in a bid to ingratiate himself with Leo's fourth wife, Zoe Karbonopsina, he presented her with a gift in the person of his own eunuch servant, Constantine Barbaros. As the imperial couple took an increased liking to Constantine, however, Samonas began to fear for his own influence and position. He first claimed that Constantine and the empress were having an affair. Leo initially believed the accusations, and had Constantine banished to a monastery. Soon, however, Leo began to miss his new favourite, and had him restored to his service in the palace. Samonas then resorted to another scheme: with his secretary, he produced a pamphlet, supposedly written by Constantine, which insulted the emperor, and arranged for Leo to read it. His machinations, however, were betrayed by one of his fellow conspirators, and Samonas was dismissed, tonsured, and banished to the monastery of Martinakios in summer of 908. Constantine succeeded him as imperial parakoimomenos. Nothing further is known of him.

== Assessment ==
If Stylianos Zaoutzes has traditionally been seen by historians as having dominated the first half of Leo's reign, Samonas is often marked as the dominant figure in the second half, namely the period from circa 900 until his own downfall in 908. According to the Byzantinist Shaun Tougher, however, in both cases the extent of the power and influence wielded by these officials over Leo appears to have been exaggerated. This is in part due to the hostility towards them in later sources, and of the desire of some of them to pin the blame for the reign's failures on Leo's supposedly all-powerful subordinates. Tougher argued that the gradual rise and abrupt fall of Samonas illustrate that, far from conforming to his traditional image of a weak and easily dominated emperor, Leo remained in control: it was the emperor's conscious patronage and support that gave such men their great power, and when it was withdrawn, their authority vanished. Samona's role as Leo's "security chief", a view adopted by a number of scholars (most prominently Romilly Jenkins) has also been questioned by Tougher, since it relies chiefly on circumstantial literary evidence from a later and distinctly hostile hagiography.

Court offices
Vacant No appointments under Basil I Title last held by Rentakios	Parakoimomenos of the Byzantine emperor 907–908	Succeeded by Constantine Barbaros
