= Byzantine bureaucracy and aristocracy =

Government of the Byzantine Empire

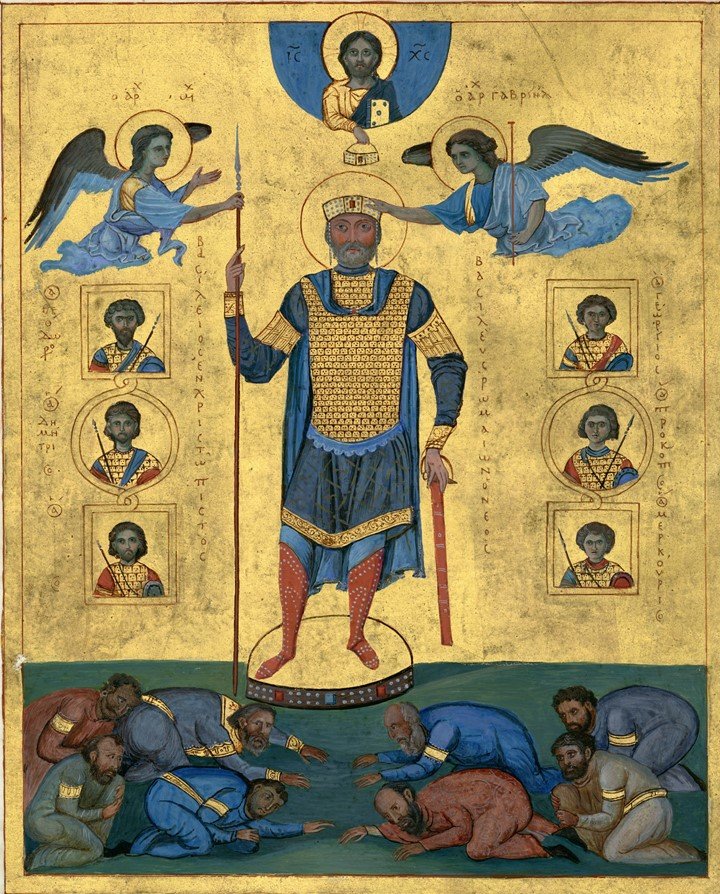
Painting of Emperor Basil II in triumphal garb, exemplifying the imperial diadem and royal power handed down by Christ and the angels.

Throughout the fifth century, Hellenistic-Eastern political systems, philosophies, and theocratic Christian concepts had gained power in the Greek-speaking Eastern Mediterranean due to the intervention of important religious figures there such as Eusebius of Caesarea (c. 260 – c. 339) and Origen of Alexandria (c. 185 – c. 253) who had been key to developing the constant Christianized worldview of late antiquity.

By the 6th century, such ideas had already influenced the definitive power of the monarch as the representative of God on earth and of his kingdom as an imitation of God's holy realm. The Byzantine Empire was a multi-ethnic monarchic theocracy adopting, following, and applying the Christian Orthodox-Hellenistic political systems and philosophies. The basileus was the incarnation of the law—nomos empsychos—and his power was immeasurable and divine in origin insofar as he channeled God's divine grace, maintaining what is good. He was the ultimate benefactor, caretaker, and saviour of the people: Evergétis, Philanthrōpía, and Sōtēr, anointed with all power, upholding the divine laws since he ought to emulate Christ first (christomimetes) in all of his divine, pious, loving christian orthodox attributes to all by being his earthly presence.

The people in turn were the monarch's paroikoi (subjects). He was the sole administrator and lawgiver of the holy Basileia and Oikoumene (commonwealth), with sole power over the state, the land, and his subjects, which he had achieved through God's appointment of him as king. This opened a new stage of reverence in which Hellenistic and Eastern court ceremonies such as proskynesis highlighted the divinity of the ruler and became standardized and often mandatory. In practice, imperial power was exercised as administration—simplified and centralized through viceroys such as the Exarchos, Douk, Katepánō, Kephalai and the Strategoi who enjoyed the same omnipotence and the emperor's God given dignity in their respective governorships.

Such concentrations of power proved to be both an internal weakness and the cause of various coups and rebellions in which viceroys with provincial armies and, sometimes, entire themes, would often challenge imperial power with claims of their own. In this way emperors such as Nikephoros II Phokas (r. 963–969) and Heraclius (r. 610–641) achieved royal power for themselves.

There were no codified laws on the imperial succession, and the Roman Republic was never formally abolished. Theoretically, each emperor was formally elected, by both the senate (Synkletos) and the army. In practice, however, the Senate had lost all of its former powers and was mostly reduced to a ceremonial role, filled with relatives or close aristocrats to the Emperor; while the Army practically had a monopoly regarding elections. Emperors usually managed to secure succession for their children through indirect means, such as appointing them as co-emperors, and thus introduced various dynasties. The absence of codified succession laws and procedures, as well as the militarized state of the Empire, led to a number of coups and revolts, leading to several disastrous results, such as the 1071 defeat at Manzikert.

Applying Christian Orthodox-Hellenistic administrative schemes, the monarch's household was the sacred kingdom Oikonomia, and he was its Christ-loving owner and manager Oikonomos, which meant that no individual or institution through the history of the empire truly owned any land in the face of state supreme ownership. Beneath the emperor, a multitude of officials and court functionaries—all directly chosen by the emperor or by one of his representatives—operated the empire's administrative bureaucracy. State officials acted not as magistrates or elected public legates, but as representatives, deputies, and viceroys of the monarch in his different domains throughout the empire. In addition to those officials, a number of honorific titles existed, which the emperor awarded to prominent subjects or to friendly foreign rulers.

Over the more than a thousand years of the empire's existence, the Imperial administrative system evolved in its adoption of historic titles. At first, the various titles of the empire were the same as those of the late Roman Empire. However, by the era of Heraclius (r. 610–641), a number of the titles had become obsolete. By the time of Alexios I (r. 1082–1118), a number of the positions were either new or drastically changed. However, from that time on, they remained essentially the same until the fall of the Byzantine Empire in 1453.

== Background history ==
In the early Byzantine period (4th to late 6th century), the administrative structure of the empire was a conglomeration of the late Roman Empire's diocese system, set up by Diocletian and Constantine, and of Justinian's innovations; in the years 535 and 536 Justinian's administrative reforms were formalized. This eliminated the administrative diocese system hierarchy established in previous centuries and with it the strict military and civic divisions within the empire, replacing it with various provincial circumscriptions directly governed by deputies of the emperor, variously called Stratalates, Strategoi and Harmost. These deputies held extraordinary military and administrative powers accompanied by prestigious new titleholders in an attempt to lessen corruption and simplify the emperor's direct handling over its domains, foreshadowing similar future administrative reforms initiated and endorsed by contemporary divine Christian Orthodox monarchical philosophy in the Greek-speaking eastern Mediterranean.

Following the transformation of the Byzantine state during the 7th century due to massive territorial loss to the Muslim conquests, this early structuring came to be replaced by the thematic military system whose functions had been simplified and specialized in the rapid creation of provincial armies. Influenced by Christian Orthodox kingship and Hellenistic theocratic philosophies, power was relegated to military leaders, with the various Strategoi, Katepan, Douk, Kephalai or Exarch each acting as viceroys in their respective "thémata" or governorships, all being appointed by the sovereign directly. These governors, being the direct representatives of the monarch himself all through the provinces, enjoyed an omnipotence of their own, accompanied by the divine attributes for being deputies of the emperor himself in their respective districts. Their primary tasks were jointly working with the various provincial subordinates of the capital bureaus for the effective collection of taxes from the different communities ("Chora", "Komai"), from the different land owners estates ("proasteion"), and from monasteries ("episkepsis"). Additionally, and more commonly, as the right hand of the emperor in the management of internal and external affairs, they had to provide an efficient management of fast and flexible provincial armies, dispatching them to appease different threats within the borders, or for the management of new successful territorial acquisitions after long-term campaigns, thereby taking key roles as protagonists of any armed offensive headed by the emperor.

A Strategos, or any military governor, was assisted by several deputies, chief among them the tourmarchēs or merarchēs (to a lesser degree also referred as topotērētēs). The main provincial governors and their deputies held equal military and administrative duties within the main sub-division inside a thema, a tourma. These deputies, or any deputy or representative of the Strategos, or of any other military governor, were generally called Ek prosopou, second to them the Krites or Praitor were responsible for the judicial matters inside a Theme. Although the range of tasks of the Krites or Praitor were neither fixed nor dogmatic, as they are shown assisting in various military campaigns or, on occasions, replacing the Strategos in his military duties.

Due to the lack of action or large-scale battles in the thematas of mainland Greece, by the 12th century most of these came to be governed directly by the Megas doux, under him the Krites or Archons of the various coastal cities. The themes, now made up of several Archontates, was accommodated and repurposed solely for the income and maintenance of the Byzantine navy, fulfilling a tax supporting role in contrast from the more active and military themas of Strategos and Katepanos focussed in Asia Minor. The duties of said governors were limited to the collection of the various maritime taxes of their governorships; the management of the various urban centers such as Athens, Corinth or Thebes; and a basic level of protection for its provinces against pirates and any other parties.

During the "classic" or middle period of the Byzantine state (8th-late 11th centuries), a new, court-centered system emerged. In this, dignities of a certain level were awarded with new titles derived from older, now obsolete, public offices. A senatorial class remained in place, which incorporated a part of the upper officialdom; every official from the rank of protospatharios (literally "first sword-bearer"; originally the head of the Emperor's bodyguards) was considered a member of it. During this period, multiple families remained important for several centuries, and several Emperors rose from the aristocracy. Two groups can be distinguished: a metropolitan civil nobility and a provincial military one, the latter remaining regionally based and having land-holdings, but apparently no military forces of their own, in contrast to contemporary Western Europe.

The backbone of Byzantine administration and economy (until the fall of Constantinople) was the joint tax liability system of the different communities inside a théma, duties which were carried out by provincial officials such as the epoptes, exisotes, and praktores of the different bureaus. A Theme was made up of several individuals and institutions, such as the various lands that the monasteries owned (episkepsis), the soldiers' farming lands (stratiotai), the estates (proasteion) of the land owners (dynatoi) and the peasants (geōrgikē), with most of a village or town (chora or komai) being made up of the latter. These were the main source of a constant and rapid revenue that ultimately derived from the earlier Hellenistic fiscal and administrative principle of "epibole". Epibole had served as an accessible tool for the Hellenistic kingdoms for the simple income and rapid collection of taxes by deputies towards various rural communities in the war-time Hellenistic period, after having been adopted and adapted from the late Roman and early Byzantine province of Egypt, which had kept its own former fixed fiscal system, proving this measure to be an indirect consequence of the multiple wars and invasions that Byzantium had to deal throughout its history.

After the reforms of Alexios I, the system underwent various changes in which, due to the desperate state of the empire and the urgent need for income to finance its military campaigns and strengthen its borders, several simplifications and concessions were made. The theme system established under the Komnenoi would remain the administrative basis of the Byzantine state until its final fall in 1453, differing in a few key aspects from its administrative predecessors; it highlighted a greater centralization of power. The various Themes had been divided into smaller districts called "Katepanakia" which in turn were made up of the various towns and villages (chora), the monastic estates (episkepsis), the estates of the dynatoi (proasteion), and the various pronoia grants. The Themes were ruled by a "Doux", who was positioned by the emperor directly, commonly a relative of his or a close aristocrat to the Basileus. The Katepanakia inside the Theme were ruled by a deputy of the Doux called a "Praktor" or "Energon", they were appointed either by the monarch or the Doux himself, with the primary task of the collection of taxes and a second role in the maintenance of basic order, administration and justice in his district.

Alexios' fiscal reforms allowed an institution or individual to catalog and group their land domains and, through it, their fiscal obligations, in a document referred as praktikon. The new reform essentially broke from the integrity of the "chora" or village tax, as its new purpose was the collection of the various taxes regardless of whether collection was by an institution, individual or the village itself, essentially offering it to the highest bidder. Although a simplification, it was not an improvement, as it pushed a variety of villages and towns to eventually be added to the different episkpesis of either the adjoining monasteries or of the various well-resourced dynatoi landowners, who would become responsible for both their fiscal obligations as monastic institutions, or as individuals, and for the fiscal obligations of the various towns and villages in their domain. This trend culminated in the eventual disappearance of the fiscal individuality that each commune or town had enjoyed, something which emperors like Basil II had fought and delayed with special taxes such as the allelengyon. Becoming one of several towns within the estates of the different institutions and individuals of the time was an unbearable phenomenon for multiple communes due to the various fiscal tolerances that the basileus offered the different monastic institutions and their estates, further accelerating the disappearance of the fiscal individuality of the villages and towns.

The 10th and 11th centuries saw a rise in importance of the aristocracy, and an increased number of new families entering it. The catastrophic losses in the latter 11th century again prompted a reorganization of the imperial administrative system, at the hands of the new Komnenos dynasty: the older offices and titles fell gradually into disuse, while an array of new honorifics emerged, which signified primarily the closeness of their recipient's familial relationship to the Emperor. The Komnenian-led Empire, and later their Palaiologan successors, were based primarily on the landed aristocracy, keeping the governance of the state tightly controlled by a limited number of intermarrying aristocratic families; for instance in the 11th and 12th century, only 80 civil and 64 military noble families have been identified, a small number for so large a state. Finally, in the Palaiologan system as reported by pseudo-Kodinos, one can discern the accumulated nomenclature of centuries, with formerly high ranks having been devalued and others taking their place, and the old distinction between office and dignity having vanished.

== Imperial titles ==
These were the highest titles, usually limited to members of the imperial family or to a few select foreign rulers whose friendship the Emperor desired.

=== Titles used by the emperors ===
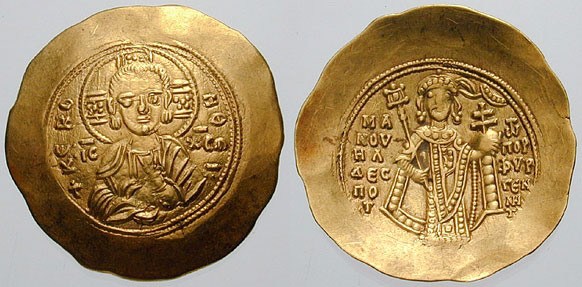
The back of this coin by Manuel I Comnenus bears his title, porphyrogennetos.

- Basileus (βασιλεύς), the Greek word for "sovereign" — Originally referred to any king in the Hellenistic period or in any Greek-speaking area of the Roman Empire. It also referred to the Shahs of Persia. Heraclius adopted it in 629, and it became the Greek word for "emperor." Heraclius also used the titles autokrator (αὐτοκράτωρ – "autocrat," "self-ruler") and kyrios (κύριος – "Lord"). The Byzantines reserved the term "basileus" among Christian rulers exclusively for the emperor in Constantinople, and referred to Western European kings as rēgas, a Hellenized form of the Latin word rex ("king"). The feminine form basilissa referred to an empress. Empresses were addressed as eusebestatē avgousta ("Most Pious Augusta"), and were also called kyria ("Lady") or despoina (the female form of "despotes", see below). Primogeniture, or even heredity, were not legally established in Byzantine imperial succession, because in principle the Roman Emperor was selected by common acclamation of the Senate, the People and the Army. This was rooted firmly in the Roman "republican" tradition, whereby hereditary kingship was rejected and the Emperor was nominally the convergence of several offices of the Republic onto one person. Multiple emperors, anxious to safeguard their firstborn son's right to the throne, had them crowned as co-emperors when they were still children, thus assuring that upon their own death the throne would not be even momentarily vacant. In such a case the need for an imperial selection never arose. In several cases, the new Emperor ascended the throne after marrying the previous Emperor's widow, or indeed after forcing the previous Emperor to abdicate and become a monk. Several emperors were also deposed because of perceived inadequacy, for example after a military defeat, and some were murdered.
- Porphyrogennētos (πορφυρογέννητος), "born in the purple" — Derived from Hellenistic bureaucracy, emperors wanting to emphasize the legitimacy of their ascent to the throne appended this title to their names, meaning they were born to a reigning emperor in the delivery room of the imperial palace (called the Porphyra because it was paneled with slabs of the reddish-purple stone porphyry), and were therefore legitimate beyond any claim to the contrary.
- Autokratōr (αὐτοκράτωρ), "self-ruler" — Originally equivalent to imperator, and was used by the emperors.
- Basileus Autokratōr (βασιλεύς αὐτοκράτωρ) – A combination of titles reserved for the senior of several ruling co-emperors (συμβασιλεῖς, symbasileis), and denoted the person who held substantive political power.

=== Titles used by the imperial family ===
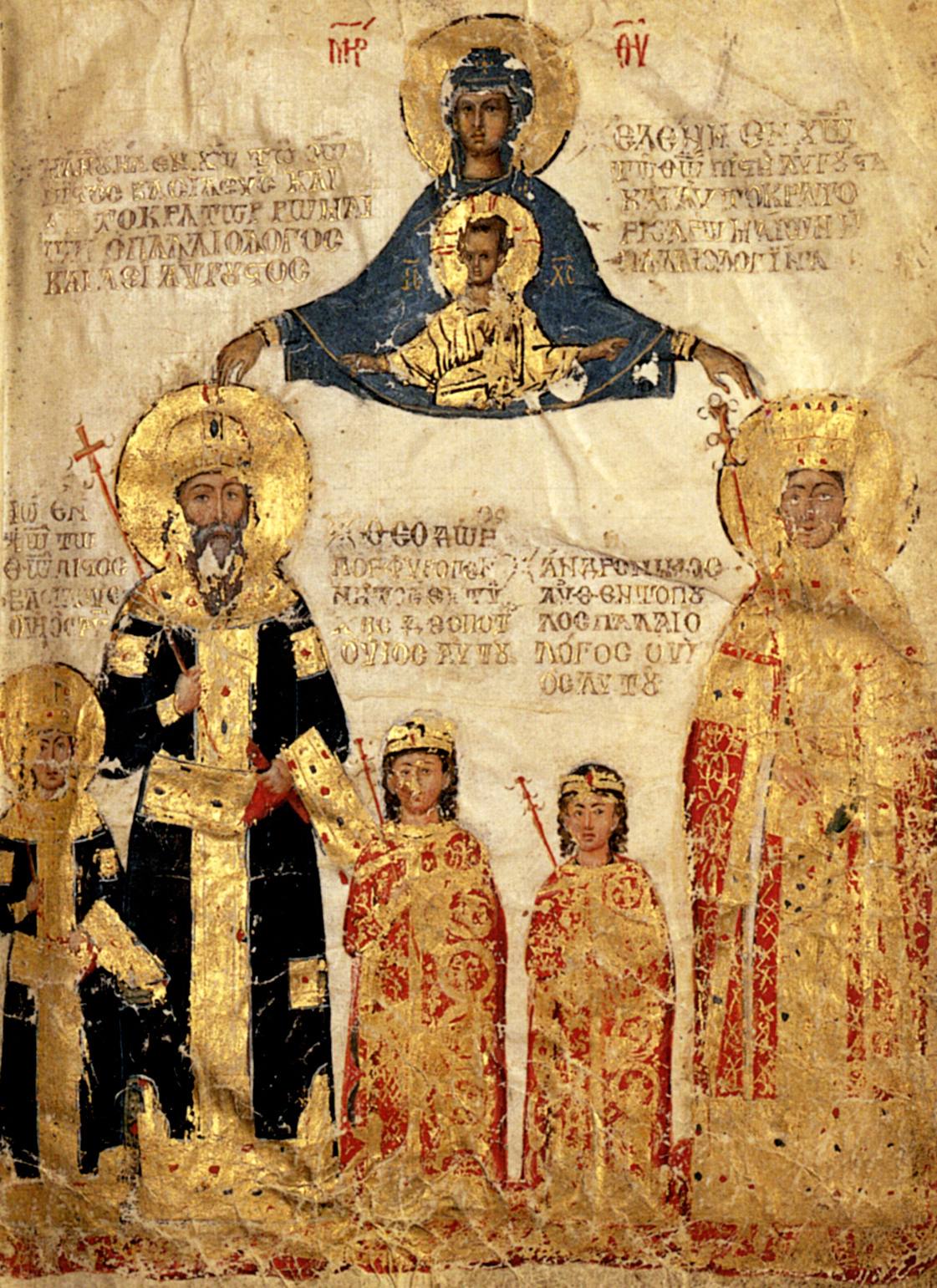
Emperor Manuel II Palaiologos with his family: empress Helena Dragaš (right), and three of their sons, John, Andronikos and Theodore. John, as his father's heir and co-emperor, wears an exact replica of his imperial costume.

- Despotēs (δεσπότης), "Lord" — Used by the emperors themselves since the time of Justinian I, and was an honorific address for the sons of reigning emperors. Hellenistic rulers had used it extensively, and during Byzantine times often featured in coins, in lieu of Basileus. In the 12th century, Manuel I Komnenos made it a separate title, the highest "awarded" title after the emperor. The first such despotēs was actually a foreigner, Bela III of Hungary, signifying that Hungary was considered a Byzantine tributary state. In later times, a despot could be the holder of a despotate; for example, the Despotate of Morea, centred at Mistra, was held by the heir to the Byzantine throne after 1261. The feminine form, despoina, referred to a female despot or the wife of a despot, but it was also used to address the Empress.
- Sebastokratōr (σεβαστοκράτωρ), "Venerable Ruler" — Created by Alexios I Komnenos as a combination of autokratōr and sebastos (see below). The first sebastokratōr was Alexios' brother Isaakios. It was essentially a meaningless title, which signified only a close relationship with the Emperor, but ranked immediately after the despotēs. The feminine form was sebastokratorissa. The first foreigner to be called sebastokratōr was Stefan Nemanjić of Serbia, who was given the title in 1191. A Bulgarian aristocrat by the name Kaloyan also used the title.
- Kaisar (καῖσαρ), "Caesar" — Originally, as in the late Roman Empire, it was used for a subordinate co-emperor or the heir apparent, and was first among the "awarded" dignities. The office enjoyed extensive privileges, prestige and power. When Alexios I created sebastokratōr, kaisar became third in importance, and fourth after Manuel I created despotēs. The feminine form was kaisarissa. However, it remained an office of importance, and was awarded to a few high-ranking and distinguished officials, and was only rarely awarded to foreigners. Justinian II named Tervel, khan of the Bulgars, kaisar in 705; the title then developed into the Slavic term tsar or czar (from Latin through Bulgarian and then into Russian, Serbian etc.). Title was also awarded to George II of Georgia. Andronikos II Palaiologos also named Roger de Flor, leader of the Catalan Grand Company, kaisar in 1304.
- Nobelissimos (νωβελίσσιμος), from the Latin Nobilissimus ("most noble") — Originally a title given to close relatives of the Emperor, subordinate only to the kaisar. During the Komnenian period, the title was awarded to officials and foreign dignitaries, diluting its status. The title Prōtonobelissimos was created in its stead, until it too started to decline, only to be replaced by a further augmented form: Prōtonobelissimohypertatos. By the late Palaiologan era, the former had vanished, while the latter was a provincial official.
- Kouropalatēs (κουροπαλάτης), from the Latin cura palatii, "charge of the palace" — First attested in the time of Justinian I, it was the official in charge of running the imperial palace. However, the authority and wealth deriving from this position, as well as the close proximity to the Emperor, meant that it accumulated prestige. It was awarded to important members of the imperial family, but from the 11th century onwards, it declined, and was usually awarded to the vassal rulers of Armenia and Georgia.
- Sebastos (σεβαστός), "August One" — This title is the literal Greek translation of the Latin term Augustus or Augoustos, which was sometimes used by the emperors. As a separate title, it appeared in the latter half of the 11th century, and was extensively awarded by Alexios I Komnenos to his brothers and relations. The female version of the title was sebastē. The special title Protosebastos ("First Venerable One") was created for Hadrianos, Alexios' second brother, and awarded also to the Doge of Venice and the Sultan of Iconium. During the 12th century, it remained in use for the Emperor's and the sebastokratōr's children, and senior foreign dignitaries. However, the parallel processes of proliferation and devaluation of titles during the 12th century resulted in the creation of a bewildering array of variations, by using the prefixes pan ("all"), hyper ("above"), prōto ("first"): examples include Pansebastos and Panhypersebastos. Few of them actually survived past the 12th century, and all of them rapidly declined in importance.

== Court titles from the 8th to 11th centuries ==
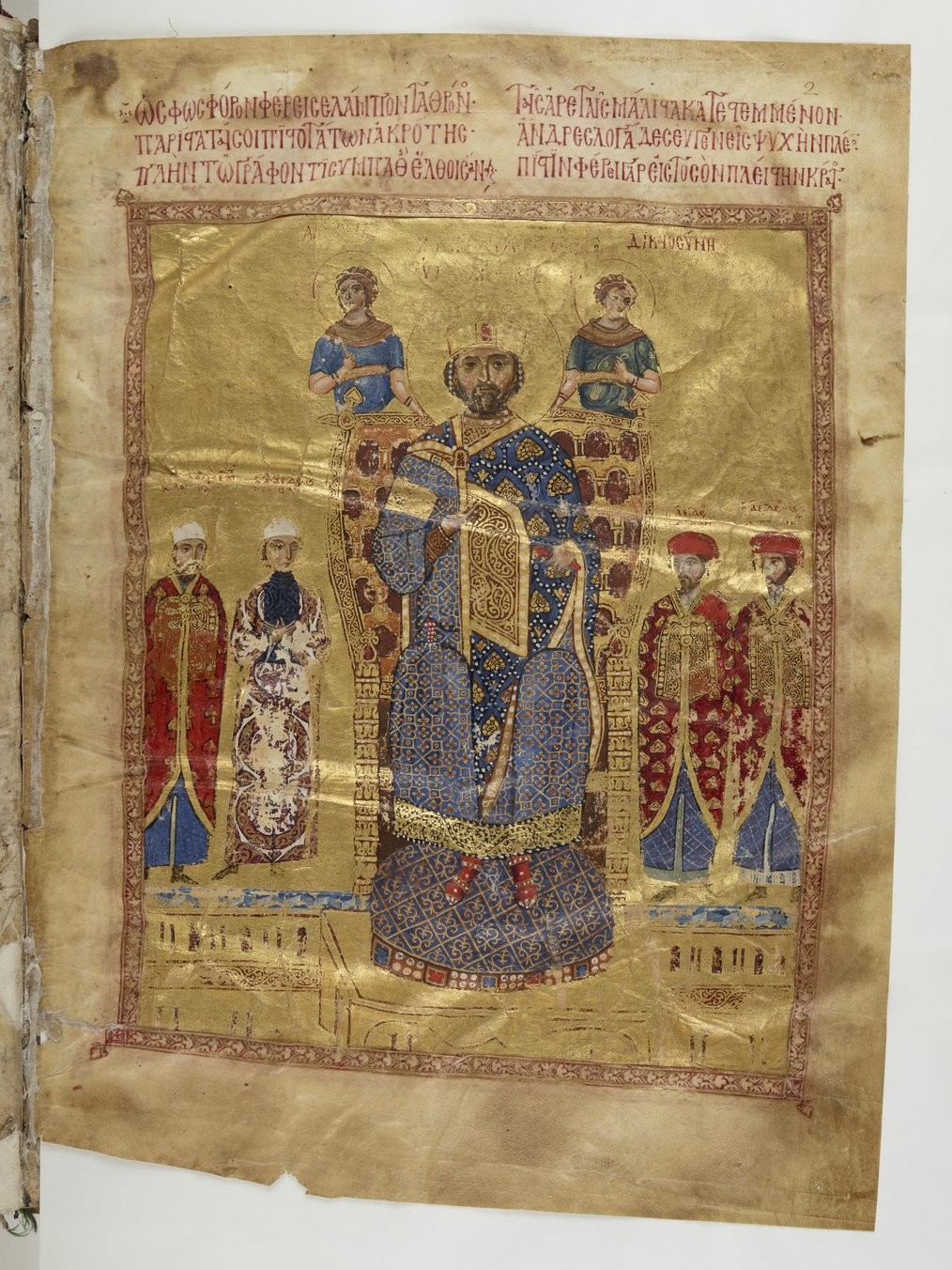
Emperor Nikephoros III with an aura flanked by personifications of Truth and Justice, and by his senior court dignitaries, from an illuminated manuscript dating to the 1070s. From left: the proedros and epi tou kanikleiou, the prōtoproedros and prōtovestiarios (a eunuch, since he is beardless), the emperor, the proedros and dekanos, and the proedros and megas primikērios.

In the 8th–11th centuries, according to information provided by the Taktikon Uspensky, the Klētorologion of Philotheos (899) and the writings of Constantine Porphyrogennetos, below the imperial titles, the Byzantines distinguished two distinct categories of dignities (ἀξίαι): the "dignities by award" (διὰ βραβείων ἀξίαι), which were purely honorific court titles and were conferred by the award of a symbol of rank, and the "dignities by proclamation" (διὰ λόγου ἀξίαι), which were offices of the state and were conferred by imperial pronouncement. The former were further divided into three subcategories, depending on who was eligible for them: different sets of titles existed for the "Bearded Ones" (βαρβάτοι from Latin barbati, i.e. not eunuchs), the eunuchs (ἐκτομίαι) and women. State officials usually combined titles from both main categories, so that a high official would be both magistros (an "awarded" title) and logothetēs tou dromou (a "proclaimed" office).

=== Titles for the "bearded ones" ===
The "by award" titles for the "Bearded Ones" (non-eunuchs) were, in descending order of precedence:

- Proedros (πρόεδρος), "president" — Originally reserved for eunuchs (see below), it was opened up in the mid-11th century to "Bearded Ones" as well, especially military officials.
- Magistros (μάγιστρος) – In the early Byzantine state, the magister officiorum was one of the most senior officials, but as his duties were gradually relegated to other officials, by the 8th century, only the title was left. It remained a high honour, and only rarely awarded until the 10th century. By the early 10th century, there were 12, the first in precedence among them bearing the title of prōtomagistros. Thereafter the number of its holders was inflated, and the office vanished sometime in the 12th century.
- Vestarches (βεστάρχης), "head of the vestai" — Adopted in the latter half of the 10th century for high-ranking eunuchs, it began being awarded to "bearded" senior military officers and judicial officials of Constantinople around 1050, before disappearing in the early 12th century.
- Vestes (βέστης) – A senior honorific title, first attested under John I Tzimiskes. Awarded to both eunuchs and non-eunuchs, it survived until the early 12th century. The term is etymologically connected to the vestiarion, the imperial wardrobe, but despite earlier attempts to connect the vestai and the related title of vestarchēs, the head of the class of the vestai (see above), with the officials of the vestiarion (see below), no such relation appears to have existed.
- Anthypatos (ἀνθύπατος), "proconsul" — Originally the highest rank for provincial governors, it survived the creation of the Theme system, until, in the 9th century, it too became a purely honorific title. The variant prōtanthypatos was created in the 11th century to counter its decline in importance, but both disappeared by the end of the 12th century.
- Patrikios (πατρίκιος), "patrician" — Established as the highest title of nobility by Constantine the Great, it remained one of the highest dignities until its disappearance in the Komnenian period, awarded to high-ranking officials, including eunuchs, and foreign rulers. The spouses of patricians bore the title patrikia (not to be confused with zōstē patrikia, see below).
- Prōtospatharios (πρωτοσπαθάριος), "first spatharios" — As its name signifies, it originally was the title borne by the leader of the spatharioi ("swordbearers," the Emperor's bodyguards). For instance, in the 6th century Narses bore this title. It later became one of the most common high court titles, awarded to senior officials such as the logothetai, the commanders of the imperial tagmata, or the strategoi in charge of a theme. The title of prōtospatharios also signified admittance to the Senate. The office survived until the Palaiologan period, but had declined to the 35th place of the hierarchy.
- Dishypatos (δισύπατος), "twice consul" — A rare dignity, which originated possibly in the 8th century.
- Spatharokandidatos (σπαθαροκανδιδᾶτος) – a blend word of the titles spatharios and kandidatos, both of which were types of palace guards in the 4th–6th centuries. The earliest references to the title occur in early 8th century and the title is clearly attested only from the early 9th century on. Its distinctive badge (brabeion) was a golden chain (maniakion) worn around the chest.[1][3]
- Spatharios (σπαθάριος), "spatha-bearer" — As their name signifies, the spatharioi were initially a special corps of imperial guards (a spatha is a kind of sword). They performed specific duties inside the imperial palace. The title survived until the early 12th century.
- Hypatos (ὕπατος), "consul" or "The supreme one" — As in the Roman Republic and Empire, the title was initially given each year to two distinguished citizens (the "ordinary consuls"), until Justinian I halted the practice due to the extraordinary expenditure it involved. It too became a purely honorific title. The title continued to be occasionally assumed by emperors on accession until the end of the 7th century. Honorary consuls however continued to be named, as attested by seals bearing the titles hypatos or apo hypatōn ("former consul"). The title was often conferred to the rulers of south Italian city-states.
- Stratōr (στράτωρ), "Groom (horses)".
- Kandidatos (κανδιδᾶτος) – From the Latin candidatus, so named because of their white tunics. They were originally a select group of guards, drawn from the Scholae Palatinae. The title disappeared in the Komnenian period.
- Basilikos mandatōr (βασιλικὸς μανδάτωρ), "imperial or royal messenger".
- Vestētōr (βεστήτωρ) — Officers of the imperial wardrobe (Latin vestiarium).
- Silentiarios (σιλεντιάριος) — Originally a group of courtiers responsible for the maintenance of order (including respectful silence) in the palace.
- Stratēlatēs (στρατηλάτης), Greek equivalent of the Latin magister militum, and apoeparchōn (ἀποεπάρχων or ἀπὸ ἐπάρχων), equivalent of the Latin ex praefectis — These two titles are listed as equal by Philotheos. Both were still high dignities in the 6th century, but were devalued afterward.

=== Titles for eunuchs ===
By descending order of precedence, the "by award" titles for the eunuchs were:

- Proedros (πρόεδρος), "president" — This was an entirely new rank introduced in the 960s by Nikephoros II Phokas and first awarded to Basil Lekapenos, the eunuch parakoimōmenos. The holder of this dignity was also the president of the Senate, and the term proedros was often used to denote precedence, e.g. proedros of the notarioi for the prōtonotarios. The title was widely awarded in the 11th century, when it was opened up to non-eunuchs, prompting the creation of the prōtoproedros to distinguish the most senior amongst its holders. It disappeared in the latter 12th century.
- Vestarches (βεστάρχης) – Adopted in the latter half of the 10th century for high-ranking eunuchs, it was awarded to "bearded" senior military officers and judicial officials of Constantinople from ca. 1050 on. It disappeared in the early 12th century.
- Patrikios – Same as for the "Bearded Ones".
- Vestes (βέστης) – Same as for the "Bearded Ones".
- Praipositos (πραιπόσιτος) – From the Latin praepositus, "placed before".
- Prōtospatharios – Same as for the "Bearded Ones".
- Primikērios (πριμικήριος) – From the Latin primicerius, "first in the list".
- Ostiarios (ὀστιάριος) – From the Latin ostiarius, "doorkeeper, usher".
- Spatharokoubikoularios (σπαθαροκουβικουλάριος), "sword-chamberlain" — A ceremonial sword-carrier assigned to the personal guard of the emperor. It later became a simple court rank.
- Koubikoularios (κουβικουλάριος) – From the Latin cubicularius, "chamberlain".
- Nipsistiarios (νιψιστιάριος), from Greek νίπτειν, "to wash hands") — The nipsistiarios was tasked with holding a gold, gem-encrusted water basin and assisting the emperor in performing the ritual ablutions before he exited the imperial palace or performed ceremonies.

=== Titles for women ===
- Zōstē patrikia (ζωστὴ πατρικία), "Girded patrikia" — This title, reserved for women, was given to the empress' ladies of honour, and, according to Philotheos, ranked high in hierarchy, above even the magistros and proedros and just below the kouropalates. The title is known from the early 9th century, and disappeared in the 11th century. Otherwise women bore the female forms of their husbands' titles.

=== Titles for foreigners ===
- Exousiastes (εξουσιαστής), "one who executes authority" — It was a style applied in the empire to some sovereign foreign rulers.

== Twelfth Century ==
After ascending the throne in 1081, Alexios I Komnenos created a new system of titles, based on kinship ties with the emperor:

1. Despot (1163) - Son-in-law and heir apparent when the emperor had no legitimate sons.
2. Sebastokrator (c. 1081) - brother or younger sons of the emperor.
3. Caesar - Son-in-law married to eldest daughter
4. (Proto)Panhypersebastos (c. 1081) - Son-in-law married to second-eldest daughters
5. Sebastohypertatos (c. 1081) - Son-in-law married to third and fourth-eldest daughter
6. Protosebastos (c. 1081)
7. Pansebastos (c. 1081)
8. Sebastos (c. 1075)
9. Protonobelissimos (c. 1070)
10. Nobilissimos
11. Protokouropalates(c. 1070)
12. Kouropalates
13. Protoproedros (c. 1070)
14. Proedros (c. 1050 for non-eunuchs)

== 14th–15th century ==
Book of Offices ranks the order of command below the emperor:

1. Despot
2. Sebastokrator
3. Caesar
4. Megas domestikos
5. Megas doux
6. Protostrator, deputy of megas domestikos
7. Megas stratopedarches
8. Megas primmikerios
9. Megas konostablos
10. Megas droungarios
11. Megas hetairearches
12. Epi tou stratou
13. Domestic of the Scholae
14. Megas droungarios of the Fleet, deputy of megas doux
15. Protospatharios
16. Megas arkhon, deputy of megas primmikerios
17. Megas tzaousios
18. Skouterios
19. Amyriales, deputy of megas droungarios
20. Megas akolouthos
21. Arkhon tou Allagion, deputy of megas arkhon
22. Protallagator
23. Domestic of the Walls
24. Vestiarios, deputy of amyriales
25. Hetaireiarches, deputy of megas hetairearches
26. Stratopedarches of the Mourtatoi
27. Stratopedarches of the Tzakones
28. Stratopedarches of the ‘cavalrymen with one horse’
29. Stratopedarches of the crossbowmen
30. Protokomes

== Palace offices ==
- Parakoimomenos (literally, "one who sleeps nearby") — The High Chamberlain who slept in the Emperor's bedchamber. Usually a eunuch, during the 9th–10th centuries the holders of this office often functioned as de facto chief ministers of the Empire.
- Protovestiarios – Usually a minor relative of the emperor who took care of the emperor's personal wardrobe, especially on military campaigns. He was also sometimes responsible for other members of the imperial household, and the emperor's personal finances. The older term, from before the time of Justinian I, was curopalata (or kouropalates in Greek). This was derived from kourator (curator), an earlier official responsible for financial matters. The vestiarios was a subordinate official. The protovestiaria and vestiaria performed the same functions for the empress.
- Papias – Concierge of the imperial palaces, responsible for opening and closing the palace gates each day.
- Pinkernes – Originally the emperor's cupbearer, later a senior honorific title.
- Kanikleios – The keeper of the imperial inkstand, one of the senior officials of the imperial chancery. In the Komnenian and Palaiologan period, some of its holders were de facto chief ministers of the Empire.
- Epi tes trapezes (ὁ ἐπὶ τῆς τραπέζης), "the one in charge of the table" — Official responsible for attending to the imperial table during banquets.

== Military offices ==
=== Army ===
- Exarchos – The exarchs were governors of remote parts of the empire such as Italy or Africa. They enjoyed a greater degree of independence than other provincial governors, combining both civil and military authority, practically acting as viceroys.
- Domestikos – The domestikoi were originally imperial guards, who later functioned as senior staff officers in the Late Roman army. In the Byzantine period, they were among the highest military offices, and included:
  - Megas domestikos, Grand Domestic – The overall commander of the army.
  - Domestikos tōn scholōn, Domestic of the Schools – The commander of the Scholai, originally a number of guards units, later a Tagma. This was a prestigious title, and by the late 9th century, its holder functioned as commander in chief of the army. In ca. 959, the post was divided, with one domestic for the East and one for the West.
  - Domestikos tōn thematōn, Domestic of the Themes – The commander and organizer of the military themes; there was one for the European themes and one for Asian themes.
- Katepanō – The governor of a greater area combining two or more themes, such as the Catepan of Italy, a title developed in the 9th century.
- Stratēgos – A military and later also civil commander of a theme, who often also had the title of doux. The term is basically equivalent to "general" or "admiral", as it was used in both branches of service.
- Tourmarchēs – The commander of a tourma, a military unit of battalion size.
- Prōtostratōr – Initially the Emperor's stable master, under the Komnenian and Palaiologan emperors the term was used for the second-ranking commander of the army.
- Stratopedarchēs, Master of the Camp – In charge of making sure the army was stocked with food and arms.
- Hoplitarchēs or archēgētēs – Commander of all infantry in an army. The title first appeared in the mid-10th century, when the infantry was reorganized and gained in importance.
- Prōtokentarchos and kentarchos – Commanders of a smaller division of the army in the field. The name was derived from the Latin centurion.
- Merarchēs – Commander of a division (meros) of the army. Usually, each army was divided into two to three such commands.
- Taxiarchēs or chiliarchēs – Commander of an infantry regiment (taxiarchia or chiliarchia) in the army.
- Pentekontarchos – Commander of 50 men in the army.
- Kavallarios – A title borrowed from the Latin caballarius, it originally meant a cavalry soldier. During the Palaiologan period, it became a minor court title.

=== Navy ===
- Megas doux, Megaduke or Grand Duke — The basic equivalent of the modern Lord High Admiral. The office was created by Alexios I Komnenos, when he combined the remnants of the imperial and thematic fleets into a single imperial fleet. By the end of the Palaiologos dynasty the megaduke was head of the government and bureaucracy, not just the navy.
- Amirales — Greek version of "Admiral", introduced via Sicilian practice; an office founded in the late Palaiologan era for Western mercenary leaders and rarely held, the amirales was the deputy of the megas doux.
- Megas droungarios — Initially the commander-in-chief of the Byzantine navy; after the creation of the megas doux his lieutenant, in charge of the naval officers.
- Droungarios – The title existed both in the army and the navy. In the navy of the 8th–11th centuries, a droungarios headed a fleet, either the central imperial fleet or one of the thematic fleets; in the army he headed a Droungos, a roughly battalion-sized grouping.
- Komēs or droungarokomēs – The commander of a squadron of dromons.
- Kentarchos or nauarchos – The captain of a ship.

=== Other military titles ===
- Ethnarchēs — The ethnarch, commander of foreign troops.
- Konostaulos — Greek form of Latin Comes stabuli "count of the stable" and various European feudal titles such as English "constable"; the chief of the Frankish mercenaries.
- Hetaireiarchēs — The chief of the barbarian mercenaries, the Hetaireia, successor to the Foederati. Initially subdivided into Greater (Megalē), Middle (Mesē) and Little (Mikra) Hetaireia.
- Akolouthos, "Acolyte" — The chief of the Varangian Guard from the Komnenian era onwards.
- Manglavitai — A category of palace guards, armed with sword and cudgel (manglavion). Under the command of a Prōtomanglavitēs.
- Topotērētēs, "place-holder" or "lieutenant" — Found at various levels of the hierarchy, as deputies to commanders of the imperial tagmata, deputy to a drungarios.

== Administrative offices ==
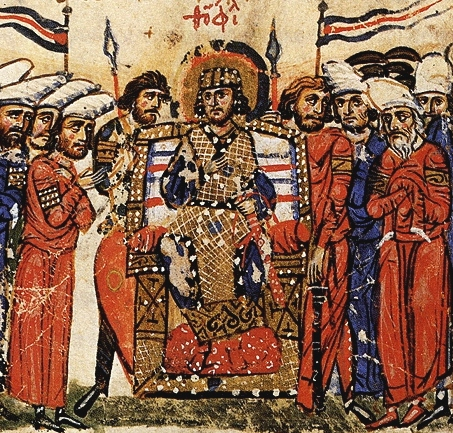
Emperor Theophilos flanked by courtiers. From the Skylitzes Chronicle.

Byzantine administrative nature was characterized by its versatility and unfixed duties in constant role change depending on a specific situation. The vast Byzantine bureaucracy had a number of titles, more varied than aristocratic and military titles. In Constantinople there were normally hundreds, if not thousands, of bureaucrats at any time. Like members of the Church and the military, they wore elaborately differentiated dress, often including huge hats. These are some of the more common ones, including non-nobles who also directly served the emperor.

- Praetorian prefect — The Praetorian prefecture was set up by Augustus as the command of the imperial Guard in Rome. It was developed by Diocletian into a civil office, whereby a handful of Prefects each acted for the Emperor with responsibility for a cluster of dioceses and provinces. Each received regular reports on administration from the provincial governors, had treasuries of his own, and paid and supplied the army with food. He was also a supreme judge of appeal; in cases which were brought before his court from a lower tribunal there was no further appeal to the Emperor. He could issue, on his own authority, praetorian edicts, but they concerned only matters of detail. The office was abolished in the 7th century as part of wide-ranging civil and military reforms, and evolved into that of the domestikos.
- Basileopatōr (βασιλεοπάτωρ), "Father of the Emperor" — An exceptional title, granted only twice in Byzantine history. Although a basileopatōr was not the emperor's actual father, and the title did not necessarily denote any familial relationship at all, both awardees were the father-in-law of the emperor: Stylianos Zaoutzes under Leo VI the Wise and Romanos I Lekapenos briefly as regent for Constantine VII, before he raised himself to co-emperor. It ranked first among the "decreed" offices, and entailed wide-ranging administrative duties.
- Protasekretis, "First Secretary" — an earlier title for the head of the chancery, responsible for keeping official government records and head of the class of senior secretaries known as asekretis. Other subordinates included the chartoularios, in charge of imperial documents; the kastrensios, a chamberlain in the palace; the mystikos, a private secretary; and the eidikos, a treasury official.
- Protonotarios — Mainly used during the middle Byzantium (8th to 10th c.), also "First Secretary" but chiefly employed as chief financial and executive officer of either each thema/province, directly under its governor-general, or as imperial secretary in various government ministries in the capital. Charged with the provisioning of the thematic troops ahead of a campaign, the Protonotarios at times resembled a Commissar of the USSR, answering only to the emperor. During the late Byzantine era, the title was only encountered at the Palaiologan court, as the emperor's private secretary. In post-imperial times the title was linked to a higher administrative position with the Orthodox Church authorities.
- Chartoularios tou vestiariou, literally "keeper of documents for the Public Wardrobe" (see Vestiarion) — Responsible for minting gold and silver coins and equipping the fleet.
- Logothetēs, "one who accounts, calculates or ratiocinates" (literally "one who sets the word") — A secretary in the extensive bureaucracy, who did various jobs depending on the exact position. In the middle and late Byzantine Empire, it rose to become a senior administrative title, equivalent to a modern minister or secretary of state. Different offices of Logothetes included:
  - Megas logothetēs, Grand Logothete — the head of the logothetes, personally responsible for the legal system and treasury, somewhat like a chancellor in western Europe.
  - Logothetēs tou dromou, Drome Logothete — the head of diplomacy and the postal service.
  - Logothetēs tōn oikeiakōn, Logothete of the oikeiakoi — the exact functions of this office are unclear.
  - Logothetēs tou genikou, General Logothete — responsible for taxation. Also acted as a secretary in later cases.
  - Logothetēs tou stratiotikou, Military Logothete — a civilian, in charge of distributing pay to the army.

Logothetes originally had some influence on the emperor, but the posts eventually became honorary. In the later empire the Grand Logothete was replaced by the mesazōn ("mediator").

Other administrators included:

- Eparch of Constantinople — The urban prefect of Constantinople.
- Quaestor — Originally an accountant or auditor, the office eventually became a judicial one for Constantinople.
- Tribounos, translation of Latin tribune — Responsible for maintenance of roads, monuments, and buildings in Constantinople (which were the responsibility of the Aedile, not the Tribunes in earlier Latin speaking times.)
- Magister (magister officiorum, magister militum, "maistor" in Greek) — An old Roman term, master of offices and master of the army; by the time of Leo III, these had become honorary titles and were eventually discarded.
- Sakellarios, "treasurer; purse-bearer" — Under Heraclius, an honorary supervisor of the other palace administrators, logothetes, etc. Later, the chief financial comptroller of the Empire.
- Praetor, Latin for "Man who goes before; first man." — One of the oldest of Roman titles, predating the Roman Republic, the title's use morphed considerably through the years. By the time of Theodosius I (379-395) it meant the leading municipal magistrate (like a modern Mayor) but from late 10th century until 1204, a civil governor of a theme.
- Kephale, "head" — The governor of a small province, usually a town and its surrounding territory, in the Palaiologan period
- Horeiarios — In charge of distributing food from the state granaries.
- Archon
- Dux
- Mystikos

The protasekretis, logothetes, prefect, praetor, quaestor, magister, and sakellarios, among others, were members of the senate.

=== Court life ===
At the peaceful height of Middle Byzantium, court life "passed in a sort of ballet", with precise ceremonies prescribed for every occasion, to show that "Imperial power could be exercised in harmony and order", and "the Empire could thus reflect the motion of the Universe as it was made by the Creator", according to the Emperor Constantine Porphyrogenitus, who wrote a Book of Ceremonies describing in enormous detail the annual round of the Court. Special forms of dress for multiple classes of people on particular occasions are set down; at the name-day dinner for the Emperor or Empress various groups of high officials performed ceremonial "dances", one group wearing "a blue and white garment, with short sleeves, and gold bands, and rings on their ankles. In their hands they hold what are called phengia". The second group do just the same, but wearing "a garment of green and red, split, with gold bands". These colours were the marks of the old chariot-racing factions, the four now merged to just the Blues and the Greens, and incorporated into the official hierarchy. As in the Versailles of Louis XIV, elaborate dress and court ritual probably were at least partly an attempt to smother and distract from political tensions.

Eunuchs also participated in court life, typically serving as attendants to noble women or assisting the emperor when he took part in religious ceremonies or removed his crown. Eunuchs in the early Byzantine Empire were usually foreigners, and they were often seen as having a low status. This changed in the 10th century, when the social status of eunuchs increased and members of the educated Byzantine upper class began to become eunuchs.

However, even by the time of Anna Comnena, with the Emperor away on military campaigns for much of the time, this way of life had changed considerably, and after the Crusader occupation it virtually vanished. A French visitor was shocked to see the Empress going to church far less well attended than the Queen of France would have been. The Imperial family abandoned the Great Palace for the relatively compact Palace of Blachernae.

== See also ==
- List of Byzantine families
- Byzantine Navy
- Byzantine battle tactics
- Byzantine army
- Byzantinism
- Aristoi
- Eupatridae

== Sources ==
- Bartusis, Mark C. (1997). The Late Byzantine Army: Arms and Society 1204–1453. University of Pennsylvania Press. ISBN 0-8122-1620-2.
- Bréhier, Louis (2000) [1949]. Les institutions de l'empire byzantin (in French). Paris: Albin Michel. ISBN 978-2-226-04722-9.
- Bury, J. B.; Philotheus (1911). The Imperial Administrative System of the Ninth Century (With a Revised Text of the Kletorologion of Philotheos). London: Oxford University Press.
- Bury, J.B. (1958). History of the Later Roman Empire: from the death of Theodosius I to the death of Justinian. Vol. 2. Dover Publications. OCLC 41478187.
- Angold, Michael (1984). The Byzantine Aristocracy: IX to XIII Centuries. BAR International Series. ISBN 0-86054-283-1.
- Guilland, Rodolphe (1967). Recherches sur les institutions byzantines (2 vols.) [Studies on the Byzantine Institutions]. Berliner byzantinische Arbeiten 35 (in French). Berlin and Amsterdam: Akademie-Verlag & Adolf M. Hakkert. OCLC 878894516.
- Guilland, Rodolphe (1971). "Les Logothètes: Etudes sur l'histoire administrative de l'Empire byzantin". Revue des études byzantines (in French). 29: 5–115. doi:10.3406/rebyz.1971.1441.
- Haldon, John F. (1997). Byzantium in the Seventh Century: The Transformation of a Culture. Cambridge University Press. ISBN 978-0-521-31917-1.
- Haldon, John (1999). Warfare, State and Society in the Byzantine World, 565–1204. London: UCL Press. ISBN 1-85728-495-X.
- Haldon, John F. (2004). Warfare, state, and society in the Byzantine world, 565-1204. Routledge. OCLC 1039560193.
- Kaldellis, Anthony (2015). The Byzantine Republic: People and Power in New Rome. Harvard University Press. ISBN 9780674365407.
- Kazhdan, Alexander, ed. (1991). The Oxford Dictionary of Byzantium. Oxford and New York: Oxford University Press. ISBN 0-19-504652-8.
- Kelly, Christopher (2004). Ruling the later Roman Empire. Harvard University Press. ISBN 978-0-674-01564-7.
- Krsmanović, Bojana (2008). The Byzantine Province in Change: On the Threshold Between the 10th and the 11th Century. Belgrade: Institute for Byzantine Studies. ISBN 9789603710608.
- Mango, Cyril A. (2007). Η Αυτοκρατορία της Νέας Ρώμης [Byzantium: The Empire of the New Rome] (in Greek). Translated by Dimitris Tsoungarakis. Athens: Educational Institution of the National Bank of Greece.
- Oikonomides, Nicolas (1972). Les listes de préséance byzantines des IXe et Xe siècles (in French). Paris: Éditions CNRS.
- Oikonomides, Nicolas (1985). "La chancellerie impériale de Byzance du 13e au 15e siècle". Revue des études byzantines (in French). 43: 167–195. doi:10.3406/rebyz.1985.2171.
- Ringrose, Kathryn M. (2003). The Perfect Servant: Eunuchs and the Social Construction of Gender in Byzantium. Chicago: The University of Chicago Press. ISBN 978-0-226-72015-9.
- Treadgold, Warren (1997). A History of the Byzantine State and Society. Stanford, California: Stanford University Press. ISBN 0-8047-2630-2.
