= Megas archon =

Byzantine court title

The title of megas archōn (Ancient Greek: μέγας ἄρχων; "grand archon") was a Byzantine court title during the 13th–14th centuries.

== History and functions ==
The title of megas archōn appears originally as a translation of foreign titles, with the meaning of "grand prince"; thus in the middle of the 10th century Emperor Constantine VII Porphyrogennetos calls the Magyar ruler Árpád as "great prince of Tourkia [Hungary]" (Ancient Greek: ὁ μέγας Τουρκίας ἄρχων) in chapter 40 of his De Administrando Imperio.

The Nicaean emperor Theodore II Laskaris (r. 1254–1258) first established it as a specific court rank, originally designating the highest-ranking officer of the emperor's retinue. By the time pseudo-Kodinos wrote his Book of Offices in the mid-14th century, however, it had become a purely honorific dignity without any duties attached. In the Book of Offices, the post is listed in the 35th place of the imperial hierarchy, between the prōtospatharios and the tatas tēs aulēs, but other contemporary lists of offices (e.g. the appendix to the Hexabiblos), which reflect the usage during the late reign of Andronikos II Palaiologos (r. 1282–1328) or during the reign of Andronikos III Palaiologos (r. 1328–1341), place him in the 38th place. The list of Xeropot. 191 places him in 34th in the hierarchy, while in the list of office given in the 15th-century manuscript Paris. gr. 1783, the title is missing. His ceremonial costume is given by pseudo-Kodinos as follows: a gold-embroidered skiadion hat, a plain silk kabbadion kaftan, and a skaranikon (domed hat) covered in golden and lemon-yellow silk and decorated with gold wire and images of the emperor in front and rear, respectively depicted enthroned and on horseback. He bore no staff of office (dikanikion).

== Known holders ==
Name	Tenure	Appointed by	Notes	Refs
Constantine Margarites	c. 1254–1258	Theodore II Laskaris	First holder of the title, created for him by Theodore II. He had previously held the titles of tzaousios, megas tzaousios, and archōn tou allagiou.	
Michael	c. 1284	Andronikos II Palaiologos	Mentioned only once as pansebastos, "megas archōn of the East", and kephalē (governor) of Rhodes and the Cyclades.	
Angelos Doukas Komnenos Tarchaneiotes	c. 1295 – c. 1332	Andronikos II Palaiologos	Military commander and later in life a monk; he is known from two funerary orations composed for him by Manuel Philes.	
Maroules	c. 1303–1305	Andronikos II Palaiologos	A military commander, he was put in command of the Byzantine troops accompanying the Catalan Company in its campaign against the Turks in Asia Minor, under the overall command of Roger de Flor. Later promoted epi tou stratou, he fought against the Catalans in Thrace in 1306–1308.	
Alexios Raoul	c. 1321	Andronikos II Palaiologos	Military commander, correspondent of Michael Gabras and Manuel Philes.	
Demetrios Angelos	c. 1332	Andronikos III Palaiologos	Oikeios of the emperor, attested as one of the witnesses to a peace treaty with Venice, concluded in November 1332.	
John Parasphondylos	c. 1342	John V Palaiologos	Attested as one of the witnesses to the renewal of the peace treaty with Venice in March 1342.	
Demetrios Doukas Kabasilas	c. 1369	John V Palaiologos	Loyalist of John VI Kantakouzenos during the Byzantine civil war of 1341–1347 and landholder in Chalcidice and megas papias, mentioned as megas archōn in an act of March 1369 about a property deed in the Zographou Monastery.	
Kabasilas	c. 1377	unknown	Attested as megas archōn at Serres, possibly son of Demetrios Doukas Kabasilas.	
[Antonios] Mandromenos	c. 1383	unknown	Attested in a single manuscript; it either refers to the megas archōn and monk Antonios Mandromenos, or to the monk Antonios, servant of the megas archōn Mandromenos	

== Sources ==
- Bartusis, Mark C. (1997). The Late Byzantine Army: Arms and Society 1204-1453. University of Pennsylvania Press. ISBN 0-8122-1620-2.
- Guilland, Rodolphe (1960). "Études sur l'histoire administrative de l'empire byzantin: les commandants de la garde impériale, l'ἐπὶ τοῦ στρατοῦ et le juge de l'armée". Revue des études byzantines (in French). 18 (18): 79–96. doi:10.3406/rebyz.1960.1221.
- Trapp, Erich; Beyer, Hans-Veit; Walther, Rainer; Sturm-Schnabl, Katja; Kislinger, Ewald; Leontiadis, Ioannis; Kaplaneres, Sokrates (1976–1996). Prosopographisches Lexikon der Palaiologenzeit (in German). Vienna: Verlag der Österreichischen Akademie der Wissenschaften. ISBN 3-7001-3003-1.
- Verpeaux, Jean, ed. (1966). Pseudo-Kodinos, Traité des Offices (in French). Centre National de la Recherche Scientifique.
