= Epi tou stratou =

The title of epi tou stratou (Ancient Greek: ἐπὶ τοῦ στρατοῦ; "the one in charge of the army") was a Byzantine military position attested during the 14th century.

== History and functions ==
According to the Book of Offices of Pseudo-Kodinos, written shortly after the mid-14th century, the epi tou stratou was a subaltern official of the megas domestikos, the commander-in-chief of the Byzantine army. On campaign, he scouted ahead of the army to find a suitable camping place, but his choice had to be confirmed by the megas domestikos. Most of the holders were military commanders, and their actual responsibilities were wider than implied by Pseudo-Kodinos; according to Rodolphe Guilland, in reality it appears that the office was simply conferred to give its holder a place in the imperial hierarchy.

In Pseudo-Kodinos' work, the office ranked 29th in the imperial hierarchy, between the prōtasēkrētis and the mystikos. His distinctive court dress consisted of a gold-brocaded hat (skiadion), a plain silk kabbadion tunic, and a domed skaranikon hat, of lemon-yellow silk and decorated with gold wire embroidery, and with a portrait of the emperor seated on a throne in front and another with the emperor on horseback on the rear. He bore no staff of office (dikanikion).

== List of known epi tou stratou ==
Name	Tenure	Appointed by	Notes	Refs
Nostongos Doukas	before 1304	Andronikos II Palaiologos	As epi tou stratou, he held command over light troops against the Turks in Asia Minor. In 1304 he was promoted to megas hetaireiarchēs and participated in the combats against the Catalan Company.	
Maroules	c. 1305	Andronikos II Palaiologos	A military commander and megas archōn, he was put in command of the Byzantine troops accompanying the Catalan Company in its campaign against the Turks in Asia Minor, under the overall command of Roger de Flor. Promoted epi tou stratou in 1305, he fought against the Catalans in Thrace in 1306–1308.	
Theodore Doukas Mouzakios	c. 1305/06	Andronikos II Palaiologos	Of western (possibly Epirote) origin, and father-in-law of Theodore Synadenos. He conspired with the Catalan Ferran d'Aunés against Andronikos II, but the plot was discovered and the two were thrown into prison. Became a monk after with the monastic name Theodoretos.	
Raoul	early 14th century	probably Andronikos II Palaiologos	First name unknown, attested only in the works of Manuel Philes.	
Kabasilas	before 1321	probably Andronikos II Palaiologos	First name unknown. Landholder in Souchan, near Dryinopolis. Died before 1321.	
Jean de Giblet	c. 1324/25	Andronikos II Palaiologos	A French nobleman from Cyprus, he was in Byzantine service, he was sent along with the parakoimōmenos Andronikos Tornikes to Savoy, to arrange the marriage of Andronikos III Palaiologos with Anna of Savoy.	
Senachereim	c. 1341	John VI Kantakouzenos (as regent)	Appointed as commander of the Byzantine navy in autumn 1341, following the dismissal of Alexios Apokaukos. He led the fleet in a series of successful combats, preventing the Turks of Saruhan Bey and Yakhshi Khan of the Karasids from crossing into Thrace from Asia Minor.	
Mark Doukas Glabas Mourinos	c. 1355–1370	John V Palaiologos	Probably of Italian origin on account of his surname (Murino). He is known from a dispute between the Docheiariou and Xeropotamou monasteries over a piece of land he had sold the former.	
Orestes	c. 1365/66	Unknown	Known as the citadel commander of Serres already c. 1350, in 1365/66 he was epi tou stratou and katholikos kritēs of the Serbs there, under the rule of Jovan Uglješa.	

== Sources ==
- Bartusis, Mark C. (1997). The Late Byzantine Army: Arms and Society 1204-1453. University of Pennsylvania Press. ISBN 0-8122-1620-2.
- Guilland, Rodolphe (1960). "Études sur l'histoire administrative de l'empire byzantin: les commandants de la garde impériale, l'ἐπὶ τοῦ στρατοῦ et le juge de l'armée". Revue des études byzantines (in French). 18 (18): 79–96. doi:10.3406/rebyz.1960.1221.
- Polemis, Demetrios I. (1968). The Doukai: A Contribution to Byzantine Prosopography. London: The Athlone Press.
- Trapp, Erich; Beyer, Hans-Veit; Walther, Rainer; Sturm-Schnabl, Katja; Kislinger, Ewald; Leontiadis, Ioannis; Kaplaneres, Sokrates (1976–1996). Prosopographisches Lexikon der Palaiologenzeit (in German). Vienna: Verlag der Österreichischen Akademie der Wissenschaften. ISBN 3-7001-3003-1.
- Verpeaux, Jean, ed. (1966). Pseudo-Kodinos, Traité des Offices (in French). Centre National de la Recherche Scientifique.
