= Baioulos =

The term baioulos (Greek: βαΐουλος) was used in the Byzantine Empire to refer to a preceptor or tutor of imperial princes. Only a handful of holders are known, but due to the office's close proximity to the imperial family, and the ties it created with future emperors, a number of baiouloi were among the most important officials of their time.

== Origin and history ==
The term derives from the Latin term baiulus ("bearer"), which by the 4th century came to mean "nurse" or "preceptor". Thus in the 12th century the theologian Theodore Balsamon claimed that it came from baïon (βαΐον, palm leaf) because the preceptor was charged with supervising the growth of young minds. The term was rarely used, and only in Byzantine times; it is not attested in Modern Greek. The 13th-century scholar Manuel Moschopoulos offers the equivalent, well-established Greek terms παιδαγωγός and παιδοτρίβης.

The term was applied to the tutors and preceptors of imperial princes, who enjoyed a rather extensive authority. As Vitalien Laurent writes, he was not only "charged with instruction and education, but all that which is needed to assist the child to become, physically and intellectually, a man". The office brought its holders in close contact with the imperial family, and the bond created between a baioulos and his pupil could lead to significant political influence. It is not a coincidence that two of the handful of holders known, Antiochus in the 5th century and Basil Lekapenos in the 10th, rose to be all-powerful chief ministers under their respective wards, while even the others appear to have played an important political role. Basil Lekapenos in particular received the even more elevated title of megas baioulos (μέγας βαΐουλος, "grand preceptor"), which may thereafter have existed alongside several junior baiouloi.

Despite its importance, the office is entirely absent from early and middle Byzantine handbooks on imperial offices and ceremonies, until the 14th century. Pseudo-Kodinos, writing after the middle of the 14th century, did not know where the megas baioulos was to be ranked in the Byzantine hierarchy, but other contemporary lists of offices, such as the appendix to the Hexabiblos and the verse list of Matthew Blastares, which reflected the usage under Andronikos II Palaiologos (r. 1282–1328) or during the reign of Andronikos III Palaiologos (r. 1328–1341), place him in the 18th place, after the parakoimomenos tou koitonos and before the kouropalates. Ernst Stein proposed that the baioulos was replaced by the tatas tes aules, but this conjecture was rejected by Laurent.

== List of known holders ==
Name	Tenure	Notes	Refs
Antiochus	early 400s	Sent by the Sassanid Persian king as tutor to the future Theodosius II (r. 408–450), he became a powerful chief minister under Theodosius. The title is most likely anachronistic, given to him by 9th-century historians.	
Stephen	580s/590s	Tutor to Theodosius, the son of Emperor Maurice (r. 582–602). The title is used in a Greek translation of a Syriac text, and may hence be anachronistic as well.	
John Pikridios	c. 789–790	Protospatharios and baioulos to Constantine VI (r. 780–797). He was tortured, tonsured, and exiled to Sicily under the regime of Empress-regent Irene of Athens in 789, but when Constantine VI came to power in 790 he was recalled. He is likely to be identified with the founder of the monastery ta Pikridiou in Constantinople.	
Gregory	c. 873/75–885	Titled primikerios and imperial protospatharios, he was strategos in southern Italy and fought against the Saracens: in 876 he captured Bari, and in 877–879 he was the addressee of four letters by Pope John VIII, asking for his aid against the Saracens. He is last attested in a deed concerning Monte Cassino in 885.	
Manuel the Armenian	c. 842/43	A distinguished military commander under Emperor Theophilos (r. 829–842), he was one of the most important officials under the early years of Theophilos' son Michael III (r. 842–867), until he lost out in a power struggle with Theoktistos. A seal of this time records the titles of "patrikios, imperial protospatharios, magistros, and bagoulos of the emperor".	
Sergios	late 9th / early 10th century	Known only through a seal giving his titles as "primikerios, imperial protospatharios and baioulos".	
Basil Lekapenos	c. 944/47	A bastard son of Emperor Romanos I Lekapenos (r. 920–944), he became megas baioulos and later parakoimomenos, and dominated the imperial government as de facto chief minister for most of the period 947–985, under emperors Constantine VII (his brother-in-law), Nikephoros II Phokas, John I Tzimiskes, and Basil II (his great-nephew).	
Leo de Maralda	c. 1019	Known only from Lupus Protospatharius as one of the envoys sent by Troia to Basil Boioannes in 1019. It is unclear whether the title baiulus is authentic rather than a later interpolation or mistranscription, or whether it refers to the Byzantine aulic position at all. "Maralda" is probably his father's name.	
Anonymous	c. 1230s	Anonymous tutor of Emperor Theodore II Laskaris (r. 1254–1258).	

== Sources ==
- Kazhdan, Alexander, ed. (1991). The Oxford Dictionary of Byzantium. Oxford and New York: Oxford University Press. ISBN 0-19-504652-8.
- Laurent, V. (1953). "Ὁ μέγας βαΐουλος. À l'occasion du parakimomène Basile Lékapène". Επετηρίς Εταιρείας Βυζαντινών Σπουδών (in French). XXIII: 193–205. hdl:11615/16013.
- Lilie, Ralph-Johannes; Ludwig, Claudia; Pratsch, Thomas; Zielke, Beate (2013). Prosopographie der mittelbyzantinischen Zeit Online. Berlin-Brandenburgische Akademie der Wissenschaften. Nach Vorarbeiten F. Winkelmanns erstellt (in German). Berlin and Boston: De Gruyter.
- Verpeaux, Jean, ed. (1966). Pseudo-Kodinos, Traité des Offices (in French). Paris: Centre National de la Recherche Scientifique.
