= Megas adnoumiastes =

The megas adnoumiastēs (Greek: μέγας ἀδνουμιαστής) was a mid-level official of the Byzantine Empire during the Palaiologan period.

== History and functions ==
The title means "grand enumerator", and derives from ἀδνούμιον (adnoumion), a term derived from the Latin ad nomen, that designated the roll call of soldiers. The few surviving records that mention the title only contain references to megaloi adnoumiastai, and not to simple holders of the office of adnoumiastēs. Apparently, the office originally entailed maintaining the lists of the soldiers. According to the Book of Offices of Pseudo-Kodinos, written shortly after the mid-14th century, the megas adnoumiastēs was a subaltern official of the megas domestikos, the commander-in-chief of the Byzantine army; he accompanied the latter during inspections, and noted down the soldiers who lacked horses or weapons, so that they could be furnished with them. Rodolphe Guilland suggested that he may have been the successor of the epi tōn basilikōn oplōn ("the one in charge of the imperial arms"), attested under Alexios III Angelos (r. 1195–1203), but admitted the lack of any firm evidence to that end. However, the few existing documentary sources show the holders of the office dealing with the administration of land grants and relevant disputes, in a role similar to that of an apographeus. There could be more than one holders of the office at the same time.

In Pseudo-Kodinos' work, the office occupied the 46th rank in the imperial hierarchy, between the koiastōr and the logothetēs toū stratiōtikou. However, in the earlier list appended to the Hexabiblos, it ranked 50th, between the aktouarios and the koiastōr, while in a 15th-century list (Parisinus gr. 1783) it was 41st, between the epi tōn deēseōn and the koiastōr. According to Pseudo-Kodinos, his uniform was typical of the mid-level courtiers: a gold-embroidered skiadion hat, a plain silk kabbadion, a skaranikon (domed hat) covered in golden and lemon-yellow silk and decorated with gold wire and images of the emperor in front and rear, respectively depicted enthroned and on horseback. His staff of office (dikanikion) was ungilt silver, with a single knob on top, on which stood a dove.

== List of known megaloi adnoumiastai ==
Name	Tenure	Appointed by	Notes	Refs
Anonymous	c. 1290	Andronikos II Palaiologos	Unnamed holder, who intervened in a dispute between the Zografou and Hilandar monasteries of Mount Athos.	
Hyaleas	before August 1310	Andronikos II Palaiologos	Pansebastos sebastos, oversaw an imperial grant of land to the Iviron Monastery of Mount Athos.	
Manuel Batrachonites	c. 1311–1315	Andronikos II Palaiologos	Sebastos, mentioned in acts relating to the Hilandar and Vatopedi monasteries of Mount Athos.	
John Angelos	c. 1317	Andronikos II Palaiologos	Oikeios of Andronikos III Palaiologos, mentioned in two acts of June and July 1317 relating to properties and privileges of the Hilandar monastery of Mount Athos.	
John Doukas Zarides	c. 1323	Andronikos II Palaiologos	A pupil of Manuel Planoudes and author, he was involved in the Byzantine civil war of 1321–1328.	
Michael Neokaisareites	c. 1324	Andronikos II Palaiologos	Oikeios of Andronikos II, mentioned in two acts as involved in regulating property disputes for the Hilandar monastery of Mount Athos.	
Alexios Hyaleas	c. 1333–1337	Andronikos III Palaiologos	Megas adnoumiastēs at Thessalonica, mentioned in the acts of the Hilandar monastery.	
George Kokalas	c. 1337	Andronikos III Palaiologos	Attested in a synodal act of October 1337 by Patriarch John XIV Kalekas, as a colleague of Alexios Hyaleas.	
George Katzaras	c. 1351 – before 1371	John V Palaiologos	Oikeios of John V, he received from him in 1351 an estate of 2,400 modioi in Kalamaria.	
John Marachas	c. 1402	Manuel II Palaiologos	Oikeios of Manuel II, he was brought on charges before the patriarchal court by his grandson, Manuel Palaiologos.	

== Sources ==
- Guilland, Rodolphe (1967). "Dignitaires des XIV^{e} et XV^{e} siècles". Recherches sur les institutions byzantines, Tome I (in French). Berlin: Akademie-Verlag. pp. 594–607.
- Kazhdan, Alexander, ed. (1991). The Oxford Dictionary of Byzantium. Oxford and New York: Oxford University Press. ISBN 0-19-504652-8.
- Maksimović, Ljubomir (1988). The Byzantine Provincial Administration under the Palaiologoi. Amsterdam: Adolf M. Hakkert. ISBN 90-256-0968-6.
- Trapp, Erich; Beyer, Hans-Veit; Walther, Rainer; Sturm-Schnabl, Katja; Kislinger, Ewald; Leontiadis, Ioannis; Kaplaneres, Sokrates (1976–1996). Prosopographisches Lexikon der Palaiologenzeit (in German). Vienna: Verlag der Österreichischen Akademie der Wissenschaften. ISBN 3-7001-3003-1.
- Verpeaux, Jean, ed. (1966). Pseudo-Kodinos, Traité des Offices (in French). Centre National de la Recherche Scientifique.
