= Megas dioiketes =

The megas dioikētēs (Greek: μέγας διοικητής) was a Byzantine court dignity during the Palaiologan period.

== History ==
The megas dioikētēs derives from the title dioikētēs ("administrator"), with the addition of megas, "grand". The dioikētēs was a provincial fiscal administrative post, which however was replaced in the early 12th century by the praktōr.

The dignity is very obscure, and is rarely mentioned in the sources. Its first mention is about an anonymous holder in a letter by Manuel Moschopoulos, written in c. 1305. Most information comes from the Book of Offices, written by pseudo-Kodinos in the middle of the 14th century. According to pseudo-Kodinos, the office held no specific function, but was a purely honorific dignity. In other sources, its holders appear to exercise fiscal and judicial functions.

In pseudo-Kodinos' work, the title ranked 55th in the court hierarchy, between the prōtallagatōr and the orphanotrophos. In other contemporary lists of offices his position varies, but is far lower, coming usually right after the logariastēs tēs aulēs. Thus in the appendix to the Hexabiblos, which reflects the usage during the late reign of Andronikos II Palaiologos (r. 1282–1328) or during the reign of Andronikos III Palaiologos (r. 1328–1341), he ranks 79th among 91 offices, right before the nomophylax and following the logariastēs tēs aulēs. In the list of Matthew Blastares, which also reflects usage under Andronikos II, he ranks 79th among 90 dignities, and in an anonymous list in verse, which probably corresponds to the situation in 1321–1328, 50th among 60. In the early 15th-century list of Paris. gr. 1783, the megas dioikētēs is the 67th among 75 dignities, in that of Vatic. gr. 962 he ranks 69th among 92 dignities, and in that of Xeropotam. 191 64th among 69 dignities.

Pseudo-Kodinos also provides information on the dignity's court dress: a skiadion hat with gold-wire embroidery, a "plain silk" kaftan-like kabbadion, and a ceremonial domed hat called skaranikon, covered with velvet and topped with a red tassel. The uniform was complemented by a staff (dikanikion) of plain wood, smooth and without a knob.

Only a handful of holders are known by name: the writer and official Theodore Kabasilas in 1316–1322; the katholikos kritēs Glabas in 1330–1341; and the sebastos John Doukas Balsamon, megas dioikētēs at Thessalonica in 1355, known only from an act concerning the Docheiariou monastery.

== Sources ==
- Kazhdan, Alexander, ed. (1991). The Oxford Dictionary of Byzantium. Oxford and New York: Oxford University Press. ISBN 0-19-504652-8.
- Macrides, Ruth J.; Munitiz, Joseph A.; Angelov, Dimiter (2013). Pseudo-Kodinos and the Constantinopolitan Court: Offices and Ceremonies. Ashgate. ISBN 978-0-7546-6752-0.
- Trapp, Erich; Beyer, Hans-Veit; Walther, Rainer; Sturm-Schnabl, Katja; Kislinger, Ewald; Leontiadis, Ioannis; Kaplaneres, Sokrates (1976–1996). Prosopographisches Lexikon der Palaiologenzeit (in German). Vienna: Verlag der Österreichischen Akademie der Wissenschaften. ISBN 3-7001-3003-1.
- Verpeaux, Jean, ed. (1966). Pseudo-Kodinos, Traité des Offices (in French). Centre National de la Recherche Scientifique.
