= St. Aberkios Monastery =

Former Greek-Orthodox church in Turkey

Coordinates: 40.3617°N 29.0264°E

Religion
- Affiliation: Christianity

Location
- Location: Kurşunlu, Bursa, Turkey
- Interactive map of St. Aberkios Monastery

Architecture
- Type: Church

The St. Aberkios Monastery is a former medieval Greek Orthodox church in Kurşunlu (Greek: Elegmi, Elegmoi), northwestern Turkey. Dating back to the middle ages, it was revered by the local Greeks until the Greco-Turkish population exchange in 1922.

The church was the katholikon of the 12th-century monastery of Elegmi. The monastic typikon, issued in 1162, makes clear that the monastery was granted to the author of the document, Nikephoros, the mystikos in the service of Manuel I Komnenos. Even though the ktetor's account of the reconstruction works does not state the erection of the church, the architectural features of St. Aberkios clearly indicate its 12th-century origins.
