= Constantine Margarites =

Constantine Margarites (Greek: Κωνσταντῖνος Μαργαρίτης) was a senior military officer and courtier of the Empire of Nicaea in the mid-13th century.

His life is only known from the brief, and very hostile, references to him in the History of George Akropolites. Akropolites disparages Margarites, as well as many other of the low-born "new men" who rose to prominence as favourites of Theodore II Laskaris (ruled 1254–58), as opposed to the traditional aristocracy which customarily monopolized high offices. According to Akropolites, Margarites was born in the theme of Neokastra in northwestern Asia Minor, a "peasant born of peasants, reared on barley and bran and knowing only how to grunt". He joined the thematic army and rose to the rank of tzaousios. His skill impressed the Nicaean emperor John III Vatatzes (r. 1222–54), who placed him in his own bodyguard, and later raised him to the post of megas tzaousios. Apparently on his accession, John's son Theodore II Laskaris made him archon tou allagiou, i.e. commander of the imperial bodyguard (allagion), and later even raised him to the new post of megas archon.

In Akropolites' account, he appears in the context of Theodore's winter campaign of 1255 in the Balkans against Bulgaria, where he and the protosebastos Manuel Laskaris were placed in command of the forces of the theme of Didymoteichon to keep watch over the Bulgarian frontier, but not engage in any expeditions of their own, while the emperor himself returned to Asia Minor. In the spring of 1256, however, the Bulgarians, learning of the emperor's absence, invited a raiding party of 4,000 Cumans to invade the Nicaean holdings in Thrace. As the Cumans approached Didymoteichon, Margarites and Laskaris disregarded the emperor's instructions to avoid a direct confrontation, and engaged the raiders. As Akropolites narrates, the swift Cuman horse-archers were able to unhorse and defeat the heavily armoured and slower Nicaeans, who broke and fled. Laskaris was able to find refuge in Adrianople, but Margarites and the other commanders of the army were captured. Akropolites reports that the prisoners were sold to the Bulgarians and that the Cumans fled north when they learned that Theodore II had crossed the Hellespont and was advancing on them, but the other contemporary historian, Theodore Skoutariotes, contradicts this, saying that a small Nicaean detachment was able to catch up with the Cumans, defeat them and liberate the prisoners.

== Sources ==
- Guilland, Rodolphe (1960). "Études sur l'histoire administrative de l'empire byzantin: les commandants de la garde impériale, l'ἐπὶ τοῦ στρατοῦ et le juge de l'armée". Revue des études byzantines (in French). 18 (18): 79–96. doi:10.3406/rebyz.1960.1221.
- Macrides, Ruth (2007). George Akropolites: The History – Introduction, Translation and Commentary. Oxford: Oxford University Press. ISBN 978-0-19-921067-1.
