= Penteconter =

Ancient Greek galley

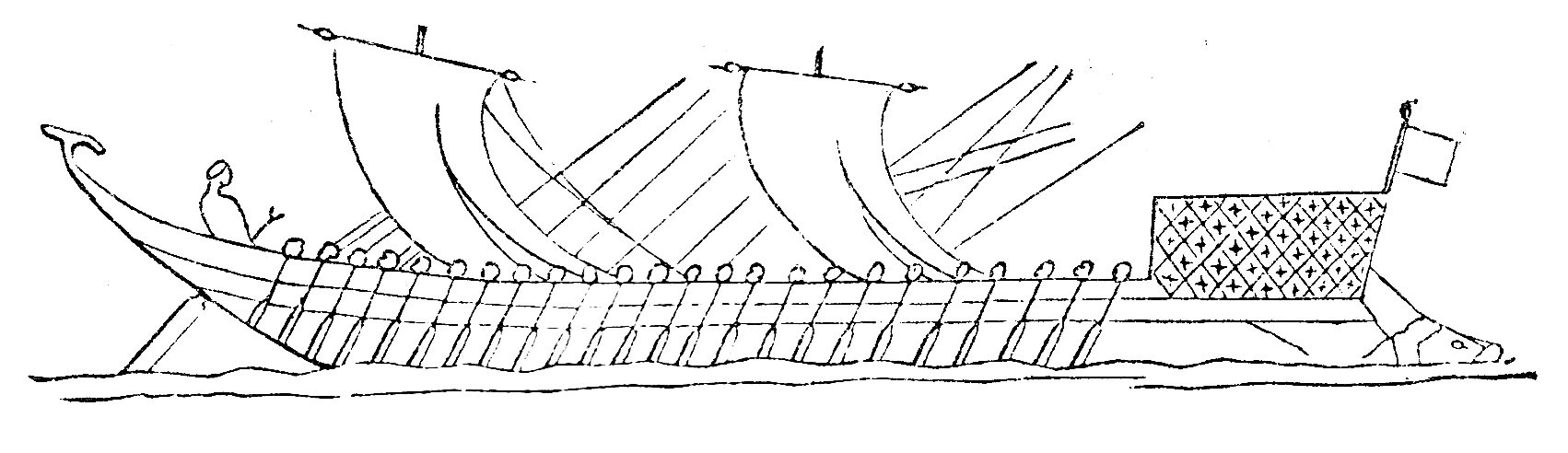

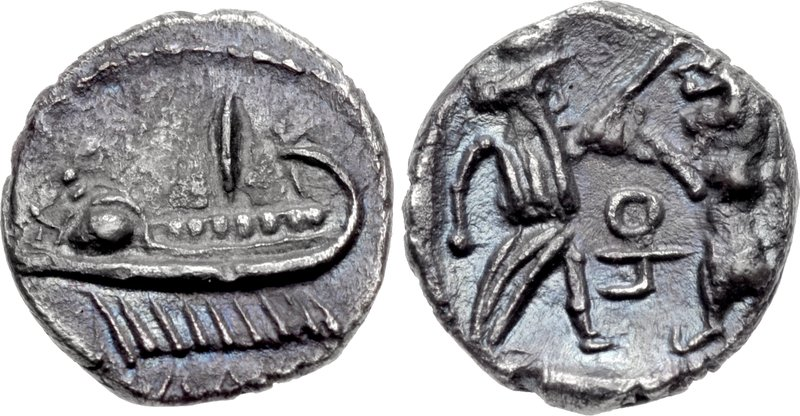
Coinage of Tennes, king of Sidon, dated 351/0 BC. Phoenician pentekonter sailing left. Date above (here faint), waves below. King of Persia standing right, holding up lion by lock of mane; Aramaic T’ between.

The penteconter (alt. spelling pentekonter, pentaconter, pentecontor or pentekontor; Greek: πεντηκόντερος, pentēkónteros, "fifty-oared"), plural penteconters, was an ancient Greek galley in use since the archaic period.

In an alternative meaning, the term was also used for a military commander of fifty men in ancient Greece.

== History ==
In contrast to the ships of the Homeric poems, used to transport warriors to the battlefield, penteconters were designed to fight at sea. They had a heavy metal ram at the bow to pierce the hull of the enemy. Speed and maneuverability were key to their design. Naval historians reconstruct their design partly from written sources, from inscriptions, and from the visual arts. In present understanding, the fifty of the pentaconter's name refers to the number of oars used to propel the ship: one bank of twenty-five oars to a side, fifty in total. A midship mast with sail could also propel the ship under favorable wind. Penteconters were longer than merchant ships, hence described as long vessels (νῆες μακραί, nḗes makraí ). They had a deck for carrying armored warriors (hoplite).

According to some contemporary calculations, penteconters are believed to have been between 28 and 33 m (92 and 108 ft) long, approximately 4 m wide, and capable of reaching a top speed of 9 knots (17 km/h; 10 mph). However, a modern reconstruction of a trireme, crewed by modern untrained amateurs, attained that top speed fairly easily on initial sea trials, which implies that the top speed of the pentaconter, with fewer oars and likely not as fast, would also have exceeded initial estimates.

== See also ==
- Hellenistic-era warships
- Pentecopterus, a genus of eurypterid named after the penteconter.
- Decarch (military rank), commander of 10
- Centurion, commander of 100
- Chiliarch, commander of 1,000
