= Demetrios Doukas Kabasilas =

Demetrios Doukas Kabasilas (Greek: Δημήτριος Δούκας Καβάσιλας; fl. 1347–87) was a senior Byzantine official and magnate of the second half of the 14th century.

He was a supporter of John VI Kantakouzenos during the Byzantine civil war of 1341–47, and forced to flee from Thessalonica in 1342, when the radical Zealot party took power in the city. He was captured and imprisoned by Kantakouzenos' opponents, but after the Kantakouzenist victory in 1347, he was released and rewarded with extensive lands in Kalamaria, near Thessalonica, and the title of megas papias. His exact origin, and particularly the reason for his use of the surname "Doukas", are unclear; his father was probably named George Kabasilas. In the documents that attest to his career, Demetrios appears to have been associated with the army. He was promoted to megas archon in 1369, and was addressed by Demetrios Kydones in a letter as late as 1386/7.

He married Anna Laskarina and had at least two sons, one of whom was the landowner Manuel Kabasilas.

== Sources ==
- Polemis, Demetrios I. (1968). The Doukai: A Contribution to Byzantine Prosopography. London: The Athlone Press.
- Trapp, Erich; Walther, Rainer; Beyer, Hans-Veit; Sturm-Schnabl, Katja (1981). "(10084) 92224. Καβάσιλας, ∆ημήτριος ∆ούκας". Prosopographisches Lexikon der Palaiologenzeit (in German). Vol. 5. Vienna: Verlag der Österreichischen Akademie der Wissenschaften.
