= Logothetes tou stratiotikou =

Byzantine imperial official

The logothetes tou stratiotikou (Greek: λογοθέτης τοῦ στρατιωτικοῦ), rendered in English as the Logothete of the Military or Military Logothete, was a Byzantine imperial official in charge of the pay and provisioning of the Byzantine army. The office appears in the late 7th century and is mentioned until the 14th century.

== History and functions ==
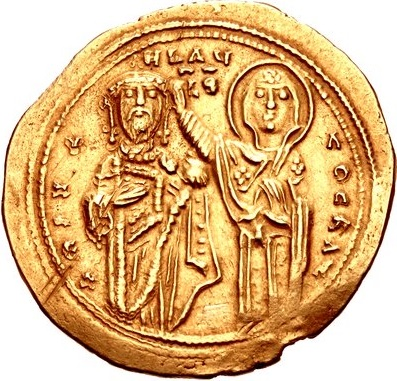
Michael VI served as Military Logothete before his brief reign as Byzantine Emperor in 1056–1057.

This duty was originally exercised by the praetorian prefecture, but the military chest (το στρατιωτικόν, to stratiotikon) was eventually detached and formed as a separate logothesion (department). The first attested logothetes tou stratiotikou was Julian, the "most glorious apo hypaton and patrikios" in 680.

The exact sphere of duties of the Military Logothete is somewhat obscure. The only direct evidence as to his functions comes from the De Ceremoniis of Emperor Constantine VII Porphyrogennetos (r. 913–959), according to which he oversaw the imposition and exemption from taxes on the households of soldiers. It is also known that by the 11th century, he exercised some juridical functions. Several scholars (notably Ernst Stein) have argued that the Military Logothete supervised military affairs in general, such as the levying of troops, the construction of fortifications and the overall military expenditure. This hypothesis, however, cannot be proved.

== Subordinate officials ==
The subordinates of the logothetes tou stratiotikou were:

- The chartoularioi of the sekreton (χαρτουλάριοι τοῦ σεκρέτου), the senior subaltern officials of the department.
- The chartoularioi of the themata (χαρτουλάριοι τῶν θεμάτων) and the tagmata (χαρτουλάριοι τῶν ταγμάτων), supervising the financial affairs of the thematic troops and the imperial tagmata, respectively.
- A number of legatarioi (λεγατάριοι), whose exact function is unknown.
- The optiones (ὀπτίονες, from Latin optio), officials responsible for the distribution of pay to the troops.
- A number of kankellarioi under a protokankellarios.
- A number of mandatores ('messengers').

== List of known logothetai tou stratiotikou ==
Name	Tenure	Appointed by	Notes	Refs
Julian	c. 680	Constantine IV	Apo hypaton and patrikios, only known as an attendant of the Sixth Ecumenical Council.	
Eustathios	probably 7th century	unknown	Known only from his lead seal of office.	
John	c. 787–790	Irene of Athens	A eunuch servant of Irene, he is mentioned as attending the Second Council of Nicaea, with the rank of imperial ostiarios and the office of "logothetes of the military logothesion". By c. 790 he was also sakellarios, and led an expedition to Italy in support of the former King of the Lombards Adelchis, who intended to recover his realm from Charlemagne. The expedition was defeated by the Franks, and John was captured and killed.	
John	8th/9th century	unknown	Known only from his lead seal of office.	
George	c. 829–843	Theophilos	Logothetes tou stratiotikou under Theophilos.	
Marinos	c. 869	Basil I the Macedonian	Patrikios and a senator, only known as an attendant of the Council of Constantinople in 869.	
Theodore Daphnopates	before 959	Romanos II	The patrikios Theodore Daphnopates, a "former logothetes tou stratiotikou" (ἀπὸ στρατιωτικῶν), was promoted by Romanos II to Eparch of Constantinople.	
Nicholas	c. mid-11th century	unknown	Michael Psellos provided a funeral oration for him.	
Michael VI Bringas	until 1056	Theodora	A career army administrator of advanced years, Michael was raised by the palace eunuchs to the throne upon the death of Empress Theodora in 1056, and reigned until deposed in 1057.	
Paul	unknown	unknown	Known only from his lead seals of office as protospatharios, epi tou Chrysotriklinou, judge of the Hippodrome, and stratiotikos logothetes.	
Michael	11th/12th century	unknown	Known only from his lead seals of office as patrikios, anthypatos, vestes and vestarches, and stratiotikos logothetes.	
Theodosios	12th century	unknown	Known only from his lead seals of office as hypatos, protospatharios and logothetes tou stratiotikou.	
Hyaleas (?)	c. 1315/16	Andronikos II Palaiologos	An inscription from 1316 mentions the pansebastos, logothetes tou stratiotikou, and kephale of Thessalonica "Hyalsou", in all likelihood a misspelling of the genitive "Hyaleou". Guilland suggests a possible identity with the megas adnoumiastes Alexios Hyaleas.	
Meliteniotes	c. 1325	Andronikos II Palaiologos	Mentioned in a legal document at Constantinople in 1325.	
Theodore Kabasilas	c. 1327	Andronikos II Palaiologos	A sebastos and former megas dioiketes. Eulogized by John Kantakouzenos as a man held in high esteem by both Andronikos II and Andronikos III, he tried to mediate between the two during the Byzantine civil war of 1321–1328.	
John Chrysoloras	c.1347	John V Palaiologos	A Roman Catholic, Chrysoloras was granted Papal licenses to trade with the Anatolian beyliks and the Mamluk Sultanate after personally travelling to Avignon. He was later promoted to the position of Logothetes tou genikou before his death in Venice c. 1373.	

Rodolphe Guilland also lists some 6th-century officials, who served under Justinian I and were in charge of the army pay chest, as predecessors of the later office of logothetes tou stratiotikou: Alexander "Scissors", active in Greece and Italy in c. 540–541; the patrikios and former praetorian prefect Archelaus, who accompanied Belisarius as his quartermaster in the Vandalic War; and the senator Symmachus, who was sent to Africa as praetorian prefect and quartermaster for Germanus in 536–539.

== Sources ==
- Bury, J. B. (1911). The Imperial Administrative System of the Ninth Century – With a Revised Text of the Kletorologion of Philotheos. London: Oxford University Press. OCLC 1046639111.
- Carr, M. (2015). "Crossing Boundaries in the Mediterranean: Papal Trade Licences from the Registra supplicationum of Pope Clement VI (1342-1352)." Journal of Medieval History 41, 107-29.
- Guilland, Rodolphe (1971). "Les Logothètes: Etudes sur l'histoire administrative de l'Empire byzantin" [The Logothetes: Studies on the Administrative History of the Byzantine Empire]. Revue des études byzantines (in French). 29: 5–115. doi:10.3406/rebyz.1971.1441.
- Kazhdan, Alexander, ed. (1991). The Oxford Dictionary of Byzantium. Oxford and New York: Oxford University Press. ISBN 0-19-504652-8.
- Martindale, John R., ed. (1980). The Prosopography of the Later Roman Empire: Volume II, AD 395–527. Cambridge: Cambridge University Press. ISBN 0-521-20159-4.
- Martindale, John R., ed. (1992). The Prosopography of the Later Roman Empire: Volume III, AD 527–641. Cambridge: Cambridge University Press. ISBN 0-521-20160-8.
- Trapp, Erich; Beyer, Hans-Veit; Walther, Rainer; Sturm-Schnabl, Katja; Kislinger, Ewald; Leontiadis, Ioannis; Kaplaneres, Sokrates (1976–1996). Prosopographisches Lexikon der Palaiologenzeit (in German). Vienna: Verlag der Österreichischen Akademie der Wissenschaften. ISBN 3-7001-3003-1.
