= Hamazaspes =

Hamazaspes (Greek: Ἁμαζάσπης; fl. 814–815) was a high-ranking Byzantine official who held the title of protasekretis, overseeing the imperial chancery. During the period of 814–815, he aligned himself with Emperor Leo V the Armenian's iconoclastic policies. The name Hamazaspes is derived from the Middle Persian Hamāzāsp, which translates to "owner of warhorses", and was common among both Persians and the Armenian nobility. As a result, it is unclear whether this specific Hamazaspes was of Iranian or Armenian heritage.

== Sources ==
- Shukurov, Rustam (2023). "Speaking Persian in Byzantium". Journal of Late Antique, Islamic and Byzantine Studies. 2 (1–2): 202–214. doi:10.3366/jlaibs.2023.0020.
- Shukurov, Rustam (2024). Byzantine Ideas of Persia, 650–1461. Routledge.
