= Kurşunlu, Gemlik =

Kurşunlu
- Neighbourhood
- Location in Turkey Kurşunlu (Marmara)
- Coordinates: 40°21′36″N 29°01′16″E
- Country: Turkey
- Province: Bursa
- District: Gemlik
- Population (2022): 1,574
- Time zone: UTC+3 (TRT)

Kurşunlu is a neighbourhood in the municipality and district of Gemlik, Bursa Province, Turkey. Its population is 1,574 (2022). It lies on the Gulf of Gemlik (Marmara Sea), at the foot of a range of hills of about 1,000 ft (300 m). It was an independent municipality until it was merged into the municipality of Gemlik in 2008.

== History ==
In the village, there is an ancient monastery called St. Aberkios Monastery. This monastery is identified with the Byzantine-era Elegmoi monastery.
