= Antiochus (praepositus sacri cubiculi) =

Antiochus or Antiochos (Greek: Ἀντίοχος, fl. 404–421) was a eunuch courtier and imperial official of the Byzantine Empire. He educated emperor Theodosius II during his minority and then acted as the emperor's chief chamberlain until 421.

According to the Byzantine chroniclers, he was of Persian origin, and had served originally under Narses, who occupied the post of chief minister (vuzurg framadhār) of the Sasanian Empire for almost the entire first half of the 5th century. He first appears in the Byzantine court in c. 404. At the time he was a servant of the imperial bedchamber (cubicularius), and although young of age enjoyed the favour of emperor Arcadius (r. 383–408). This allowed him to influence imperial policy, and gained him the post of tutor (baioulos) to the young heir to the throne, the future Theodosius II (r. 402–450). The 9th-century chronicle of Theophanes the Confessor reports erroneously that Antiochus came to Constantinople only after Arcadius' death in 408, having been dispatched by the Persian shah Yazdegerd I (r. 399–420) to watch over the young Theodosius. It may be, however, that this report reflects the recognition of his position as imperial tutor by Yazdegerd, whom the dying Arcadius had entrusted with ensuring his son's position during his minority. Antiochus was a zealous Christian, and in his correspondence with Yazdegerd succeeded in securing the well-being of Christians in his home country.

Antiochus probably exercised his duties as tutor until 414, when Theodosius' sister Pulcheria took over. By c. 421, he had risen to the post of praepositus sacri cubiculi, head of the imperial bedchamber, and the exalted rank of patricius. At about that time, he was dismissed from his palace posts by Theodosius, probably after the emperor's marriage to Aelia Eudocia. His property was confiscated, and he was forced to retire as a monk to the Church of Saint Euphemia at Chalcedon, where he later died. His palace in Constantinople, adjacent to the Hippodrome, was also confiscated by the emperor.

== Sources ==
- Greatrex, Geoffrey; Bardill, Jonathan (1996). "Antiochus the "Praepositus": A Persian Eunuch at the Court of Theodosius II". Dumbarton Oaks Papers. 50: 171–197. doi:10.2307/1291743. JSTOR 1291743.
- Kostenec, Jan (2008-07-26). "Palace of Antiochos". Encyclopedia of the Hellenic World, Constantinople. Archived from the original on 2015-12-08.
- Martindale, John R., ed. (1980). The Prosopography of the Later Roman Empire: Volume II, AD 395–527. Cambridge: Cambridge University Press. ISBN 0-521-20159-4.
