= Hetaireiarches =

The hetaireiarches (Ancient Greek: ἑταιρειάρχης), sometimes anglicized as Hetaeriarch, was a high-ranking Byzantine officer, in command of the imperial bodyguard, the Hetaireia. In the 9th–10th centuries there appear to have been several hetaireiarchai, each for one of the subdivisions of the Hetaireia, but in later times only the senior of them, the megas hetaireiarches (Ancient Greek: μέγας ἑταιρειάρχης) or Great Hetaeriarch survived, eventually becoming simply a high court rank in the 12th–15th centuries.

== History ==
The Imperial Hetaireia (βασιλική ἑταιρεία, basilike hetaireia) was a bodyguard regiment of the Byzantine emperors in the 9th–11th centuries, originally recruited mainly from among foreigners. It is first mentioned in 812, as a bodyguard for the emperor on campaign, but its origin is obscure. The Imperial Hetaireia of the 9th–10th centuries was divided in several units: three or four according to the sources, distinguished by their epithets and each, at least originally, under is respective hetaireiarches.

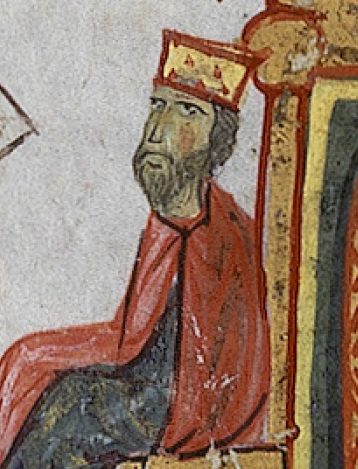
Emperor Romanos I Lekapenos, from the 12th-century Madrid Skylitzes manuscript

Thus the megas hetaireiarches commanded the 'Great Hetaireia' (μεγάλη ἑταιρεία, megale hetaireia). He was the senior of the military officials known as stratarchai and as a result of his prominence was often referred to simply as 'the hetaireiarches' (ὁ ἑταιρειάρχης), without further qualification. It was a very important position in the late 9th and first half of the 10th centuries, as he was in charge of the emperor's security, and was entrusted with delicate assignments. It is telling that the future emperor Romanos Lekapenos held this post, and was succeeded by his son Christopher Lekapenos. According to the mid-10th century De Ceremoniis, written by Emperor Constantine VII Porphyrogennetos (r. 913–959), the megas hetaireiarches and his unit are charged with the protection of the emperor's tent on campaign, and with the security of the imperial palace, in close association with another palace official, the papias.

A 'Middle Hetaireia' (μέση ἑταιρεία, mese hetaireia) is attested in sources, but without its hetaireiarches; indeed, this unit appears to have been placed under the megas hetaireiarches during the course of the 10th century. Conversely, a 'Lesser Hetaireia' (μικρὰ ἑταιρεία, mikra hetaireia) is not attested but implied by the reference to Stylianos Zaoutzes as holding the post of mikros hetaireiarches under Emperor Michael III (r. 842–867). Alternatively, the unit of the mikros hetaireiarches may be identical to the "barbarian" regiment composed of the two companies of the Chazaroi (Χαζάροι, Khazars) and the Pharganoi, which is called the 'Third Hetaireia' (τρίτη ἑταιρεία, trite hetaireia) in the Escorial Taktikon of c. 975.

In the 11th century, the post of [megas] hetaireiarches became detached from its military duties, but remained an important court position: it was held by several influential palace eunuchs in the 11th century, and by second-rank nobles and junior relatives of the Byzantine imperial family, such as George Palaiologos, in the Komnenian period. Under Manuel I Komnenos (r. 1143–1180), the megas hetaireiarches became responsible for arms production and conducted important diplomatic missions.

In the Palaiologan period, the megas hetaireiarches was held by members of prominent noble families. In the Book of Offices of Pseudo-Kodinos, the megas hetaireiarches is placed 25th in the palace hierarchy, between the megas droungarios tes vigles and the megas chartoullarios. In other Palaiologan-era lists, which include different ranks and offices and reflect the order of precedence at different times, he ranks as high as 23rd or as low as 27th. The spouse of a megas hetaireiarches was a member of the women's court, and bore the feminine version of her husband's title: megale hetaireiarchissa. Ordinary hetaireiarchai are also attested, at 63rd place, between the vestiariou and the logariastes tes aules. Other lists have them at 67th–69th place, below the protokomes, or even at 75th or 82nd place. Their chief function, according to Pseudo-Kodinos, was as ushers at receptions.

According to Pseudo-Kodinos, the court costume of the megas hetaireiarches consisted of a plain silk kabbadion tunic and a staff (dikanikion) topped with a gilded knob and covered with alternating golden and blue braid. For ceremonies and festivities, he bore the domed skaranikon hat, of yellow and golden silk and decorated with gold wire embroidery, and with a portrait of the emperor seated on a throne in front and another with the emperor on horseback on the rear. The ordinary hetaireiarches was dressed in a long silk kabbadion, a skaranikon covered in red velvet and topped by a small red tassel or a skiadion hat of the klapoton style, and a golden-topped staff covered with alternating yellow and blue braid.

== Sources ==
- Bury, J. B. (1911). The Imperial Administrative System of the Ninth Century – With a Revised Text of the Kletorologion of Philotheos. London: Oxford University Press. OCLC 1046639111.
- Karlin-Hayter, Patricia (1974). "L'hétériarque. L'évolution de son rôle du "De Cerimoniis" au "Traité des Offices"". Jahrbuch der Österreichischen Byzantinistik (in French). 23: 101–143.
- Kazhdan, Alexander, ed. (1991). The Oxford Dictionary of Byzantium. Oxford and New York: Oxford University Press. ISBN 0-19-504652-8.
- Kühn, Hans-Joachim (1991). Die byzantinische Armee im 10. und 11. Jahrhundert: Studien zur Organisation der Tagmata (in German). Vienna: Fassbaender Verlag. ISBN 3-9005-38-23-9.
- Macrides, Ruth J.; Munitiz, Joseph A.; Angelov, Dimiter (2013). Pseudo-Kodinos and the Constantinopolitan Court: Offices and Ceremonies. Farnham, Surrey: Ashgate. ISBN 978-0-7546-6752-0.
- Magdalino, Paul (2002) [1993]. The Empire of Manuel I Komnenos, 1143–1180. Cambridge: Cambridge University Press. ISBN 0-521-52653-1.
- Oikonomides, Nikos (2001). "Some Byzantine State Annuitants: Epi tes (Megales) Hetaireias and Epi ton Barbaron". Byzantina Symmeikta. 14: 9–28. ISSN 1105-1639. Archived from the original on 2012-02-16.
