= Dioiketes =

Ancient administrative official title

Dioikētēs (Greek: διοικητής), often Latinized as dioecetes, is a term applied to a variety of administrative officials.

== Origin and history in antiquity ==
The term derives from διοίκησις (dioikēsis), literally "housekeeping", which already in Classical Antiquity came to mean "administration", especially connected with finances, both public and sacred (connected to the temples). Officials in charge of administration were thus designated ὁ ἐπὶ τῇ διοικήσει (ho epi tē dioikēsei).

The title of dioikētēs is mostly attested in Ptolemaic Egypt, where it was held by the head of the kingdom's financial administration, headquartered in the capital Alexandria. In addition, provincial dioikētai existed, possibly one for every province (nome). The office survived Egypt's annexation into the Roman Empire, and is well attested, with Roman occupants, throughout the Roman period. Outside Egypt, the title is less frequently used, being attested in some Syrian cities, as well as in Corfu; in some places dioiketai are attested for smaller bodies (e.g., the ephēboi of Cyzicus), or even in private households.

== Byzantine Empire ==
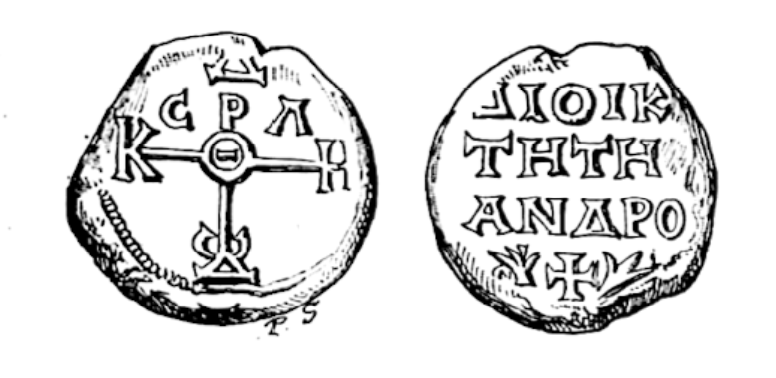
Seal of an anonymous Byzantine dioiketes of Andros (8th/9th century)

In Byzantine times, the term was employed more widely for a type of tax collector, being first attested in 680, in the acts of the Third Council of Constantinople. The dioikētai of this period were subordinate officials of the logothetēs tou genikou, the head of the "general" (genikon) fiscal department, and detailed to provincial duties. From their surviving seals, both the older Late Roman civil provinces as well as the newer theme are attested, but most of the dioikētai were sent to individual islands or—mostly coastal—cities. The last seal for a dioikētēs of this kind dates to the early 10th century, while holders from then on were assigned to specific themes. Modern scholarship suggests that the dioikētai were rewarded by the practice known as synētheia, a fee representing a fixed portion of the taxes they raised. In addition to the dioikētai of the genikon, dioikētai of the mētata (διοικηταὶ τῶν μητάτων) are also attested as subaltern officials of the logothetēs tōn agelōn, the minister responsible for the state-run horse and mule farms (mētata).

In the fiscal administration, the dioikētēs was replaced after 1109 by the praktōr. A variant of the title survived into the Palaiologan period as the megas dioikētēs. In Modern Greek usage, the term means simply "administrator, commander".

== See also ==
- Epistates
- Oikonomos
- Procurator

== Sources ==
- Brandis, Karl Georg (1905). "Διοικητής". Realencyclopädie der Classischen Altertumswissenschaft. Band V, Halbbände 9–10, Demogenes-Ephoroi.
- Capponi, Livia (2005). Augustan Egypt: The Creation of a Roman Province. Routledge. ISBN 9781135873691.
- Kazhdan, Alexander, ed. (1991). The Oxford Dictionary of Byzantium. Oxford and New York: Oxford University Press. ISBN 0-19-504652-8.
- Hagedorn, Dieter, Zum Amt des "dioiketes" im römischen Ägypten, Yale Classical Studies 28 (1985) pp. 167–210.
