= Theotokos Euergetis Monastery =

The monastery of Theotokos Euergetis (Greek: Θεοτόκος Εὐεργέτις, lit. 'Theotokos the Benefactress') was a monastery in the European suburbs of the Byzantine capital, Constantinople, established in 1049 and surviving until the 13th century.

== History ==
The monastery was founded in 1049, when a certain Paul retired to his estate, located some 3 kilometres (1.9 mi) from the walls of Constantinople, and settled there as a monk. He was joined by several other monks, and a number of cells were erected to house this small community. When Paul died in 1054, his successor as abbot, Timothy, became the monastery's second founder. Timothy managed to accumulate sufficient funds to build a new church and larger cells, and in c. 1055 he issued the monastery with new regulations in the form of two charters (typika): one for the rules of daily life, and one for its liturgy. The former was used as a model for the foundation typika of a number of major Byzantine monasteries, such as those of Theotokos Kosmosoteira, Heliou Bomon, Kecharitomene, and Hilandar, and is the main source of information about the Theotokos Euergetis monastery itself.

According to the typikon, the monastery also included a hospice for travellers, and had a dependency (metochion) within Constantinople. One of the main benefactors of the monastery was the Serbian prince and archbishop Saint Sava, who visited it often between 1196 and 1235. During the Latin Empire, the monastery became a dependency of the monastery of Monte Cassino, but it appears that the Greek monks of Euergetis were allowed to remain. The monastery disappears from the record after the 13th century.

== Sources ==
- Talbot, Alice-Mary; Cutler, Anthony (1991). "Euergetis Monastery". In Kazhdan, Alexander (ed.). The Oxford Dictionary of Byzantium. Oxford and New York: Oxford University Press. pp. 740–741. ISBN 0-19-504652-8.
