= Pentekontarch =

The Pentekontarch (Greek: ὁ πεντηκόνταρχος, romanized: pentēkontarchos, Latin: pentacontarchus) was a commander of fifty men (penta, "fifty", archon, "leader") in Ancient Greece and the Byzantine Empire. The term was also used in English translations of the Bible for "captains of fifty". The commander led a unit of fifty known as pentēkontarchia, part of larger phalanxes. In the Early Middle Ages, the Byzantine officer rank signified command of 50, and was above Decarch (command of 10) and below Hekatonarch (command of 100), komes (command of 200), droungarios (command of 400–1000), and finally the Tourmarches (topoteretes).

== See also ==
- Byzantine bureaucracy and aristocracy
