= Heliou Bomon monastery =

The monastery of Heliou Bomon (Greek: Ἡλίου Βωμῶν, lit. 'altars of the Sun') was active during the middle Byzantine period, in the 10th–12th centuries, located in modern Kurşunlu.

Heliou Bomon is first attested in the 10th century, although Raymond Janin has suggested that it is identical with the Elaiobomoi ("olive altars") monastery, mentioned in the 9th century. In the 12th century, after a period of decline, it was renovated by the mystikos Nikephoros, who rebuilt it and restored to it its confiscated estates with the financial assistance of Emperor Manuel I Komnenos (r. 1143–1180). Originally a patriarchal monastery, it now became independent, and in 1162 Nikephoros issued its new regulations (typikon), modelled on those of Theotokos Euergetis and Saint Mamas. The new regulations limited the number of monks to twenty, both at the monastery itself as well as in its dependency (metochion) in Constantinople.

Heliou Bomon was apparently also known, or at some point united with, a monastery called "Elegmoi", which is also first mentioned in the 10th century. The monastery was located in Bithynia, at the modern village of Kurşunlu, and was part of the monastic community of the Bithynian Olympus. Emperor Michael V Kalaphates was confined there after his overthrow in 1042. In the late 12th century, the abbot (hegoumenos) of the monastery became head of the monks of Mt. Olympus.

According to Cyril Mango the surviving, 12th-century church of St. Aberkios at Kurşunlu is to be identified with the monastery's church erected by Nikephoros the mystikos.

== Sources ==
- Talbot, Alice-Mary (1991). "Heliou Bomon Monastery". In Kazhdan, Alexander (ed.). The Oxford Dictionary of Byzantium. Oxford and New York: Oxford University Press. pp. 910–911. ISBN 0-19-504652-8.
