= Tzaousios =

The tzaousios (Greek: τζαούσιος) was a late Byzantine military office, whose exact functions and role are somewhat unclear.

The term is derived from the Turkish çavuş, meaning "courier" or "messenger", and was in use by the Byzantines perhaps as early as the late 11th century. In the 13th–15th centuries, it became applied to officers serving in provincial posts. A tzaousios could serve as commander of the garrison of a kastron (a fortified administrative center run by a kephale), possibly combining the military and administrative roles, or as an officer to the megala allagia of the imperial field army. Most of the tzaousioi mentioned in the sources came from the Byzantine Morea, where they played an important role in provincial administration. In Macedonia and Thrace by contrast, they seem to have been limited to a purely military role within the megala allagia.

The variant megas tzaousios (μέγας τζαούσιος, "grand tzaousios") is a court title first attested under John III Vatatzes (r. 1221–1254). His functions are unclear. The French Byzantinist Rodolphe Guilland suggested that he was in command of subordinated tzaousioi, who acted as the successors of the earlier imperial courier corps, the mandatores. In pseudo-Kodinos's mid-14th century Book of Offices, he is described as being responsible for maintaining the order of the imperial retinue. Certainly, the first megas tzaousios, Constantine Margarites, was the commander of Vatazes's personal retinue, but in later times, the title does not appear to have corresponded to a specific function.

== See also ==
- Chiaus

== Sources ==
- Bartusis, Mark C. (1997). The Late Byzantine Army: Arms and Society 1204–1453. Philadelphia, Pennsylvania: University of Pennsylvania Press. ISBN 0-8122-1620-2.
- Guilland, Rodolphe (1967). "Dignitaires des XIV^{e} et XV^{e} siècles". Recherches sur les institutions byzantines [Studies on the Byzantine Institutions]. Berliner byzantinische Arbeiten 35 (in French). Vol. I. Berlin and Amsterdam: Akademie-Verlag & Adolf M. Hakkert. pp. 594–607. OCLC 878894516.
- Kazhdan, Alexander (1991). "Tzaousios". In Kazhdan, Alexander (ed.). The Oxford Dictionary of Byzantium. Oxford and New York: Oxford University Press. ISBN 0-19-504652-8.
