= Decarch =

Military rank

Decarch (Greek: δέκαρχος (dekarkhos), Latin: decarchus) was a rank in the Late Roman army, used in the East Roman army, among Greek-speaking soldiers, that continued on as a Byzantine military rank.

== History ==
In Latin, the rank was called decurio (initially, in the cavalry only) and later decanus (in both the infantry and cavalry); the Greek term is Latinised as decarchus. It referred to the second or third-to-last rank, above a pentarch, and later, above a pentarch and tetrarch. (The tetrarch appears in the Strategikon of Maurice, but it may have become a rank earlier, in the reign of Zeno). Variant Greek terms for the rank include δεκαίος (dekaios) and δεκάρχης (dekharkes). The term δέκαρχος is recorded as early as 135 AD, where it appears as an equivalent of decurion in the Alanica of Arrian.

The Miracles of Saint Demetrius mentions the Centarch, Pentekontarch and Decarch, but not the Chiliarch. Conversely, the Life of Saint Philaretus the Merciful does not mention the decarch. Warren Treadgold theorises that this is because at that time the irregular troops of Thessalonica did not amount to 1,000 men and therefore were without a chiliarch, while the Life of Saint Philaretus does not mention decarchs because they were so far beneath the others. Both texts omit the pentarchs and tetrarchs, but they appear again in 9th-century texts and cannot have fallen into disuse in the meantime.

The rank's antecedent was the decurio (decurion), originally a cavalry rank under the Roman Republic and the Principate, which became an infantry rank during the Dominate after the reforms of Diocletian. A decurion originally commanded ten men; however, this was reduced by Diocletian to eight (including the decurion himself). Although the Late Roman δέκαρχος seems to have been used interchangeably with decurio and decanus in the East, it sometimes was not used at all: Saint Jerome lists the ranks of a typical cavalry regiment that includes no decarch or decurion, and research shows that some infantry units used this system as well. The source of the innovation is the Scholae Palatinae of Constantine the Great, and Treadgold reasons that at the time frontier regiments East and West using the older and newer rank systems were deployed together, and each understood the system used by the other. For a cavalry regiment like Jerome's, Vegetius says that the lowest-ranking functionaries were circitor and semissalis (Note: Originally a circitor was a function, not a rank, describing a soldier who inspected the sentries, and a semissalis was a senior soldier entitled to an extra half-ration) and these probably became ranks in the Scholae, roughly equivalent to the decarch. In regiments that used decarchs, there would have been 50 of them.

== Pay scale ==
Both Byzantine and Arab sources shed some light on the pay scale for the 8th-9th century rank of decarch and its place in the pay scale. Three Arab geographers all seem to have a common source: prisoner of war named al-Jarmi became familiar with a Byzantine military while in Byzantine custody; in fact, one geographer explicitly names al-Jarmi as his source. Al-Jarmi was frontier official who was captured by the Byzantines, probably in a great raid of Theophilus in 837; he was later exchanged in 845. Al-Jarmi wrote a book on the Byzantine empire that survived at least a century for other Arab writers to excerpt, but which is lost today.Al Jarmi is very precise, sometimes more so that surviving Byzantine documents; he probably got hold of an official Byzantine manual published in the wake of Theophilus's military reforms.

Al-Jarmi says that a "Roman" (i.e. Byzantine) soldier was paid 12 nomismata a year, after twelve years service. Treadgold thinks this is a misinterpretation of a policy that started a soldier off with 1 nomisma a year (known from other sources), with twelve years experience probably required to reach the rank of decarch and its attendant 12 nomismata in pay. The pay scales reported by al-Jarmi match in proportion, although not precisely in amount, the later pay scales of Constantine VII.
