= Hetaireia =

Military term of Byzantine Empire

The Hetaireia (Ancient Greek: Ἑταιρεία, romanized: Hetaireía, Byzantine Greek pronunciation: [(h)e.teˈri.a], Latinized as hetaeria) was a term for a corps of bodyguards during the Byzantine Empire.

== Etymology and usage of the term ==
Hetaireia means 'Company, Association, Brotherhood' (from Ancient Greek: ἑταῖροι, romanized: hetaîroi, lit. 'companions, partners, comrades'), echoing the ancient Macedonian Companions and the Classical Greek aristocrats who attended symposia.

The most important such corps was the 'Imperial Hetaireia' (βασιλική ἑταιρεία, basilikḗ hetaireía), composed chiefly of foreigners, which formed part of the Byzantine professional standing army alongside the tagmata in the 9th–12th centuries. The term hetaireia was also applied to the smaller bodyguards of thematic military commanders (strategoi), headed by a count (κόμης τῆς ἑταιρείας, kómēs tês hetaireías), and from the 13th century on, it was employed in a generic sense for the armed retinues of magnates, bound by oath to their master.

== Imperial Hetaireia ==
The exact origin, role, and structure of the Imperial Hetaireia are unclear. The term first appears in the early 9th century, as the bodyguard of Emperor Leo V the Armenian (r. 813–820) on campaign. It is unclear, however, whether the usage is technical, referring to a specific unit, or simply as a term for bodyguard; it is not until the reign of Theophilos (r. 829–842) that the unit is definitely attested. John B. Bury theorized that it was the evolution of the earlier Foederati, but this supposition was rejected by John Haldon as the two units are mentioned as co-existing in some sources. According to Haldon, it likely began as part of the tagma of the Vigla—which also functioned as a palace guard in its early history—before becoming an independent unit.

The bulk of the Hetaireia was apparently composed of foreigners (ethnikoi), and contemporary accounts list Khazars, Pharganoi, (Note: The meaning of the term Pharganoi (Φαργάνοι) has been the subject of debate among modern scholars. It could denote their origin from the area of Central Asia around the Fergana Valley, or it could be a misspelling of Pharangoi, i.e. Varangians.) Tourkoi (i.e. Magyars), Franks and Arabs. Hans-Joachim Kühn even refers to it as a "Byzantine Foreign Legion". For this reason, although it is frequently mentioned alongside the native Byzantine tagmata, it was always a unit apart, with its own peculiar internal structure and a different role: whereas the tagmata were the professional regiments forming the core of the Byzantine army on campaign, the Hetaireia was responsible for the protection of the emperor's person.

The Hetaireia of the 9th–10th centuries was divided in several units: three or four according to the sources, distinguished by their epithets and each, at least originally, under is respective hetaireiarches (Ancient Greek: ἑταιρειάρχης, lit. 'master of the hetaireia').

The senior unit was the 'Great Hetaireia' (μεγάλη ἑταιρεία, megálē hetaireía), under the megas hetaireiarches, who ranked as the senior of the military officials known as stratarchai and was often referred to simply as 'the hetaireiárkhēs' (ὁ ἑταιρειάρχης) par excellence. It was a very important position in the late 9th and first half of the 10th centuries, as he was in charge of the emperor's security, and was entrusted with delicate assignments. It is telling that the future emperor Romanos Lekapenos held this post, and was succeeded by his son Christopher Lekapenos. According to the mid-10th century De Ceremoniis, written by Emperor Constantine VII Porphyrogennetos (r. 913–959), the megas hetaireiarches and his unit are charged with the protection of the emperor's tent on campaign, and with the security of the imperial palace, in close association with another palace official, the papias.

A 'Middle Hetaireia' (μέση ἑταιρεία, mésē hetaireía) is attested in sources, and the possible existence of a 'Lesser Hetaireia' (μικρὰ ἑταιρεία, mikrà hetaireía) is implied by the reference to Stylianos Zaoutzes as mikros hetaireiarches under Emperor Michael III (r. 842–867). Alternatively, the unit of the mikros hetaireiarches may be identical to the barbarian regiment composed of the two companies of the Chazaroi (Χαζάροι, Khazars) and the Pharganoi, which is called the 'Third Hetaireia' (τρίτη ἑταιρεία, trítē hetaireía) in the Escorial Taktikon of c. 975. The historian Warren Treadgold estimates the total strength of the Imperial Hetaireia in the early 10th century at 1,200 men.

By the early 10th century, honorary posts in the Hetaireia were prestigious appointments that could be purchased by native Byzantine officials, connected to an annual stipend (roga) paid by the imperial treasury to the holder. A post in the 'Great Hetaireia' cost a minimum of 16 litrai of gold and paid a roga of 40 nomismata, with one additional litra for each additional seven nomismata; a post in the 'Middle Hetaireia' a minimum of ten litrai, with a roga of 20 nomismata; and in each of the Chazaroi or Pharganoi companies, a minimum of seven, with a roga of 12 nomismata. According to Haldon, this may be evidence that the Hetaireia "was developing already into a show force, and eventually no longer served as a fighting part of the imperial guard".

As the 10th century progressed, a tendency of amalgamation of the various units into a single command becomes evident, as the 'Middle Hetaireia' seems to have been placed under the megas hetaireiarches. The importance of the Hetaireia as a bodyguard corps declined thereafter, but the unit was one of the few regiments of the middle Byzantine army to survive into the Komnenian-era army, being attested well into the reign of Emperor Manuel I Komnenos (r. 1143–1180). By this time, however, its composition had changed: in the late 11th century, Nikephoros Bryennios the Younger reports that the Hetaireia was "customarily" made up of young Byzantine nobles rather than foreigners.

The post of [megas] hetaireiarches also survived, and, detached from its military duties, remained an important court position: it was held by several influential palace eunuchs in the 11th century, and by second-rank nobles and junior relatives of the Byzantine imperial family, such as George Palaiologos, in the Komnenian period. In the Palaiologan period, it was held by members of prominent noble families.

== See also ==
- Hetair-, a Greek linguistic root
- Somatophylakes

== Sources ==
- Bury, J. B.; Philotheus (1911). The Imperial Administrative System of the Ninth Century (With a Revised Text of the Kletorologion of Philotheos). London: Oxford University Press.
- Haldon, John F. (1984). Byzantine Praetorians: An Administrative, Institutional and Social Survey of the Opsikion and Tagmata, c. 580–900. Bonn: R. Habelt. ISBN 3-7749-2004-4.
- Kazhdan, Alexander, ed. (1991). The Oxford Dictionary of Byzantium. Oxford and New York: Oxford University Press. ISBN 0-19-504652-8.
- Kühn, Hans-Joachim (1991). Die byzantinische Armee im 10. und 11. Jahrhundert: Studien zur Organisation der Tagmata (in German). Vienna: Fassbaender Verlag. ISBN 3-9005-38-23-9.
- Magdalino, Paul (2002) [1993]. The Empire of Manuel I Komnenos, 1143–1180 (Second ed.). Cambridge: Cambridge University Press. ISBN 9780521526531.
- Oikonomides, Nikos (2001). "Some Byzantine State Annuitants: Epi tes (Megales) Hetaireias and Epi ton Barbaron". Byzantina Symmeikta. 14: 9–28. ISSN 1105-1639. Archived from the original on 2012-02-16.
- Treadgold, Warren T. (1995). Byzantium and Its Army, 284–1081. Stanford, California: Stanford University Press. ISBN 0-8047-3163-2.
