= Kritai katholikoi =

Supreme court during the late Byzantine Empire

The kritai katholikoi tōn Rhomaiōn (Greek: κριταὶ καθολικοὶ τῶν Ῥωμαίων, "universal judges of the Romans") were a supreme court during the late Byzantine Empire.

== History ==
The court had its antecedent in a tribunal of 12 judges, composed of both secular (senatorial) judges and of ecclesiastical members, created by Andronikos II Palaiologos (r. 1282–1328) in 1296. It functioned as a supreme court, and there was no appeal from its decisions. The tribunal was reduced to four members, at least one of whom had to be a bishop, by Andronikos III Palaiologos (r. 1328–1341) in 1329, and received the name "kritai katholikoi". According to Manuel II Palaiologos (r. 1391–1425), they had authority over all matters; received only written complaints; conducted the hearings, including expert testimony where deemed necessary; and deliberated in seclusion, with the judgement resulting from the majority of opinions. The first four judges were Joseph, Bishop of Apros, Gregory Kleidas, an archdeacon and dikaiophylax, the megas dioiketes Glabas, and Nicholas Matarangos, probably a scholar. They served until a major corruption scandal in 1336/7, of which the first three were found guilty.

Besides the original tribunal resident in the capital Constantinople, similar boards of judges appeared in the course of the 14th century in the Byzantine territories of the Despotate of the Morea, in Thessalonica, and Lemnos, as well as in the Byzantine-influenced Serbian Empire and the Empire of Trebizond.

== See also ==
- Byzantine law
- Constantine Harmenopoulos

== Sources ==
- Kazhdan, Alexander, ed. (1991). The Oxford Dictionary of Byzantium. Oxford and New York: Oxford University Press. ISBN 0-19-504652-8.
