= Tatas tes aules =

The tatas (Ancient Greek: τατᾶς), more formally the tatas tes aules (Ancient Greek: τατᾶς τῆς αὐλῆς, lit. 'tatas of the court') was a Byzantine court office attested in the 12th–14th centuries, whose exact functions are unclear.

The title is first attested in the seal of John Komnenos Vatatzes in the 12th century, and over the next two centuries. Nevertheless, the exact functions it entailed are unclear: according to the 14th-century historian Pachymeres, the tatas was one of the three major court functionaries along with the pinkernes (imperial cup-bearer) and the epi tes trapezes (master of the imperial table), but the 15th-century historian Doukas explains the title as "pedagogue". This led Ernst Stein to suggest that he succeeded the baioulos as imperial preceptor, a hypothesis rejected later by Vitalien Laurent.

== Sources ==
- Kazhdan, Alexander (1991). "Tatas". In Kazhdan, Alexander (ed.). The Oxford Dictionary of Byzantium. Oxford and New York: Oxford University Press. pp. 2013–2014. ISBN 0-19-504652-8.
- Verpeaux, Jean, ed. (1966). Pseudo-Kodinos, Traité des Offices (in French). Centre National de la Recherche Scientifique.
