= Allagion =

Byzantine military unit of 50-400 soldiers

The allagion (Greek: ἀλλάγιον) was a Byzantine military term designating a military unit of 50-400 soldiers. It first appeared in the mid-to-late 10th century, and by the 13th century had become the most frequent term used for the Byzantine army's standing regiments, persisting until the late 14th century.

== Etymology ==
The term means "rotation of duties" and first appears in the Tactica of Leo VI the Wise in the early 10th century for a generic body of troops. In a more technical use it came into use as an alternate term for a cavalry bandon, numbering between 50 and 400 men. In the 10th and 11th centuries, provincial allagia had some 50–150 men, while those of the central imperial army were closer to the upper limit, with circa 320–400 men.

== Allagia in the late Byzantine era ==
From the late 11th century, as evidenced in the writings of Michael Attaleiates, the term also began to be used in a more specific sense for the troops of the imperial bodyguard. By the late 13th century, the term had largely replaced the earlier tagma in colloquial and technical (although not entirely in literary) usage to designate any standing regiment. Each allagion was headed by an allagatōr (ἀλλαγάτωρ).

The mid-14th century writer Pseudo-Kodinos also mentions a court office, that of the archōn tou allagiou (ἄρχων τοῦ ἀλλαγίου, "master of the allagion"), which apparently appeared in the 1250s under Theodore II Laskaris and in Pseudo-Kodinos's time occupied the 53rd place in the palace hierarchy. He served as the second-in-command of the imperial escort. His uniform comprised a skiadion hat decorated with gold wire, a kaftan-like kabbadion in silk "as it is commonly used", a velvet-covered skaranikon with a red tassel on top, and a baton of office of plain smooth wood. The emperor's own allagion (i.e. his military retinue) seems to have been replaced by the two divisions of the rather obscure Paramonai corps, one on foot and one on horse. These, however, were still commanded, according to Pseudo-Kodinos, by an allagatōr each, while the protallagatōr (πρωταλλαγάτωρ, "first allagatōr") probably commanded the corps as a whole. According to Pseudo-Kodinos, the protallagatōr occupied the 54th position in the palace hierarchy. He led the rear of the emperor's escort, forcing any stragglers to hurry up and maintain formation. His uniform was identical to that of his superior, the archōn tou allagiou, except that instead of a staff he bore a gilded silver mace (matzouka), whose handle was covered in red silk, with a gilded tip on top and a gilded chain in the middle. Both the archōn tou allagiou and the protallagatōr were under the supervision of the megas primmikērios. Very few holders of any of the offices of archōn tou allagiou, protallagatōr or allagatōr are mentioned in the sources.

The allagia of the provincial army were divided into two distinct groups: the "imperial allagia" (βασιλικά ἀλλάγια, basilika allagia) and the "great allagia" (μεγάλα ἀλλάγια, megala allagia). The former were found in Byzantine Asia Minor, while the latter in the Empire's European provinces only. With the gradual fall of Asia Minor to the Turks during the late 13th and early 14th centuries, the "imperial allagia" finally disappeared. The "great allagia", of which three are known by name – the Thessalonian (μέγα ἀλλάγιον Θεσσαλονικαῖων), that of Serres (Σερριωτικόν μέγα ἀλλάγιον), and that of Bizye (Βιζυητεικόν μέγα ἀλλάγιον) – are first attested in 1286 and continue to be mentioned until 1355. Almost certainly, however, they date at least from the reign of Emperor Michael VIII Palaiologos (r. 1259–1282), and perhaps even before him to the Laskarid emperors of Nicaea who conquered these lands. They too disappeared as their provinces fell to the Serbs and the Ottoman Turks.

The exact role, nature and structure of the European megala allagia are not fully clear. As their jurisdiction encompassed the regions around these cities, conforming roughly to the old themata of Thessalonica, Strymon, and Thrace respectively, they may represent an attempt to centralize control over the provincial military forces, at a time when political control was increasingly devolving from the capital to the periphery. How extensive their reach was is, however, open to question. It is known that their forces comprised both frontier troops providing garrisons for fortresses, as well as cavalry pronoias. In addition, they may have included small land-holders and mercenaries. As Mark Bartusis comments on the various attempts to explain their role, "at the one extreme the megala allagia were the central element in the late Byzantine army; every soldier who lived in the provinces and who had a military obligation [...] was a megaloallagitēs...", meaning that they represented a universal military organization involved in the recruitment and maintenance of all provincial forces, from which only the imperial guards and the personal retinues of local governors must be excluded. On the other extreme, the megala allagia may have been only a partial aspect of the late Byzantine military system, confined only to some provinces and from which foreign mercenaries were probably excluded. The office of tzaousios also occurs in the early 14th century in the context of the megala allagia of the region of Thessalonica. Its exact functions, however, within these units are unknown.

The size of the allagia was apparently equivalent to the old banda at circa 300–500 troops; thus the Chronicle of the Morea records that Constantine Palaiologos had a force of 18 allagia or 6,000 cavalry troops at his command in the Morea the early 1260s.

== Sources ==
- Bartusis, Mark C. (1997). The Late Byzantine Army: Arms and Society 1204–1453. Philadelphia, Pennsylvania: University of Pennsylvania Press. ISBN 0-8122-1620-2.
- Guilland, Rodolphe (1960). "Études sur l'histoire administrative de l'empire byzantin: les commandants de la garde impériale, l'ἐπὶ τοῦ στρατοῦ et le juge de l'armée". Revue des études byzantines (in French). 18 (18): 79–96. doi:10.3406/rebyz.1960.1221.
- Haldon, John F. (1984). Byzantine Praetorians: An Administrative, Institutional and Social Survey of the Opsikion and Tagmata, c. 580–900. Bonn: Rudolf Habelt. ISBN 3-7749-2004-4.
- Haldon, John (1999). Warfare, State and Society in the Byzantine World, 565–1204. London: UCL Press. ISBN 1-85728-495-X.
- Kazhdan, Alexander, ed. (1991). The Oxford Dictionary of Byzantium. Oxford and New York: Oxford University Press. ISBN 0-19-504652-8.
