= Papias (Byzantine office) =

Eunuch official in the Byzantine court

The papias (Ancient Greek: παπίας) was a eunuch official in the Byzantine court, responsible for the security and maintenance of the buildings of the imperial palaces in Constantinople. He commanded an extensive staff and performed in important role in palace ceremonies. In the Palaiologan period, the honorary title of megas papias ('grand papias') was created and awarded to senior aristocrats.

== History and role ==
The term is etymologically connected to πάππος or παπᾶς (lit. 'father, priest'). It is first attested in a seal dated to circa 550–650, and next recorded in the chronicle of Theophanes the Confessor for the year 780. There were three papiai, all eunuchs: one for the Great Palace itself (παπίας τοῦ μεγάλου παλατίου, papias tou megalou palatiou), and two others for its adjuncts, the Magnaura and the palace of Daphne (the παπίας τῆς Μαγναῦρας and παπίας τῆς Δάφνης). The latter was created by Emperor Michael III (r. 842–867), while the former is attested only in Philotheos's Kletorologion of 899. The papias of the Great Palace was a very important official. Often styled 'grand papias' (μέγας παπίας, megas papias), and usually holding the rank of protospatharios, he was the concierge of the palace and responsible for its security. He held the keys to the doors of the palace (and of the palace prison) and opened them every morning together with the megas hetaireiarches. He thus controlled physical access to the imperial quarters, and was an important element in any conspiracy against the emperor's life, as demonstrated in the usurpations of Michael II in 820 and Basil I in 867. It is possible that initially the other two papiai were subordinate to the papias of the Great Palace.

Like all senior palace functionaries, the papias of the Great Palace also fulfilled certain ceremonial duties. Aside from the ritual unlocking of the palace doors, he for instance formally ended the daily imperial audiences by rattling the keys, the symbol of his office. At ceremonies for the promotion of officials, he censed the main audience hall of the Chrysotriklinos and the emperor, and on August 1, he carried a cross in procession through the streets of the capital, visiting the most wealthy citizens and receiving donations.

By the 12th century, the papias was probably opened up to non-eunuchs as well. New papiai for the Chalke and the new Blachernae Palace are also attested in the 12th century. In the Palaiologan period, the megas papias ('grand papias') became a specific dignity awarded to senior members of the aristocracy. In the 13th century, it was probably an actual office, but it became a purely honorary title in the 14th century. In the mid-14th century Book of Offices of Pseudo-Kodinos, the title occupies the 22nd position in the Byzantine imperial hierarchy, and its insignia were: a wooden staff (dikanikion) with alternating gold and red-gold knobs, a skiadion hat with embroidery of the klapoton type, another type of hat called skaranikon of white and gold silk with gold-wire embroidery and images of the emperor in the front and back, and a silk robe of office or kabbadion.

== Subordinate officials ==
The papiai were in charge of an extensive staff detailed to the cleaning, lighting, and general maintenance of the each palace, aided by a deputy, the Deuteros (δεύτερος, 'the second one'), who was separately responsible for the safekeeping of imperial furniture and insignia. The subordinates of the papias included:

- The diaitarioi (διαιτάριοι [τοῦ μεγάλου παλατίου], under a domestikos (δομέστικος [τοῦ μεγάλου παλατίου]). They were chamberlains responsible for the various rooms (δίαιται, diaitai) of each palace. They were also known as hebdomadarioi (ἑβδομαδάριοι), apparently because they worked in weekly shifts. Further, diaitairioi of various buildings of the Great Palace complex are also attested in the 10th century: of the palaces of Daphne and Magnaura, the halls of the Consistory, the Ostiarikon, the Stratorikion, and the Nineteen Couches and of the palace chapels of St. Stephen and the Theotokos.
- The various lower servants: loustai (λουσταί, 'bathers') responsible for the baths, the kandelaptai (κανδηλάπται, 'candle-lighters') in charge of lighting, the kamenades (καμηνάδες) or kaldarioi (καλδάριοι, cf. caldarium) in charge of heating, and the horologoi (ὡρολόγοι) in charge of clocks. The functions of another category, the zarabai (ζαράβαι), are unclear.

Nicolas Oikonomides also adds the minsourator (μινσουράτωρ), an official in charge of the Byzantine emperor's tent on campaign, to the subordinates of the papias. Similar staffs must have also existed for the papiai of the Magnaura and the Daphne Palace.

== Sources ==
- Bury, J. B. (1911). The Imperial Administrative System of the Ninth Century – With a Revised Text of the Kletorologion of Philotheos. London: Oxford University Press. OCLC 1046639111.
- Guilland, Rodolphe (1967). Recherches sur les institutions byzantines [Studies on the Byzantine Institutions]. Berliner byzantinische Arbeiten 35 (in French). Vol. I. Berlin and Amsterdam: Akademie-Verlag & Adolf M. Hakkert. OCLC 878894516.
- Kazhdan, Alexander, ed. (1991). The Oxford Dictionary of Byzantium. Oxford and New York: Oxford University Press. ISBN 0-19-504652-8.
- Oikonomides, Nicolas (1972). Les listes de préséance byzantines des IXe et Xe siècles (in French). Paris: Éditions du Centre National de la Recherche Scientifique.
- Verpeaux, Jean, ed. (1966). Pseudo-Kodinos, Traité des Offices (in French). Paris: Éditions du Centre National de la Recherche Scientifique. ISBN 9782222009016.
