= Protasekretis =

Senior official in Byzantine bureaucracy

The protasekretis or protoasekretis (Greek: πρωτ[ο]ασηκρῆτις), Latinized as protasecretis or protoasecretis, was a senior official in the Byzantine bureaucracy. The title means "first asekretis", illustrating his position as the head of the order of the asekretis, the senior class of imperial notaries.

The post evolved gradually. The first asekretis are attested from the 6th century, and several Ecumenical Patriarchs of Constantinople and one emperor, Anastasios II (r. 713–715), were drawn from their ranks. Aside from possibly anachronistic references to Maximus the Confessor being a protasekretis under Emperor Heraclius (r. 610–641), the earliest confirmed occurrence (as proto a secreta) comes from the Liber Pontificalis for the year 756. As head of the imperial chancery (the effective successor of the late Roman primicerius notariorum), the position was highly influential: in the 899 Kletorologion of Philotheos, a list of court precedence of officials, he is placed seventh among the sekretikoi, the financial ministers of the state. From documents and sigillographic evidence, the holders of the office held the dignities of protospatharios, patrikios and anthypatos. Among others, the Patriarch Photios (858–867 and 877–886) held the post.

His subordinates included not only the asekretis, but also the inferior class of the imperial notarioi, under their head, the protonotarios, as well as the official known as dekanos, placed "in charge of the imperial papers" according to the De Ceremoniis of Emperor Constantine VII Porphyrogenitus (r. 913–959). The protasekretis seems also to have been in charge of preparing the imperial chrysobulls. After 1106, however, he was moved from the chancery and assumed judicial duties, heading one of the highest courts of the Byzantine Empire, along with the eparchos, the megas droungarios tes viglas, the dikaiodotes, the koiaistor, the epi ton kriseon, and the katholikos, who headed the court for fiscal affairs (demosiaka pragmata). Although the class of the asekretis is not attested after the 12th century, the post of protasekretis survived into the Palaiologan period.

== Sources ==
- Bury, J. B. (1911). The Imperial Administrative System of the Ninth Century – With a Revised Text of the Kletorologion of Philotheos. London: Oxford University Press. OCLC 1046639111.
- Kazhdan, Alexander (1991). "Protasekretis". In Kazhdan, Alexander (ed.). The Oxford Dictionary of Byzantium. Oxford and New York: Oxford University Press. p. 1742. ISBN 0-19-504652-8.
- Magdalino, Paul (1994). "Justice and Finance in the Byzantine State, Ninth to Twelfth Centuries". In Laiou, Angeliki E.; Simon, Dieter (eds.). Law and Society in Byzantium, 9th-12th Centuries. Washington, District of Columbia: Dumbarton Oaks. pp. 93–116. ISBN 0-88402-222-6.
