= Mystikos =

Byzantine office of the imperial chancery

The mystikos (Greek: μυστικός, "the secret one") was an important Byzantine office of the imperial chancery from the 9th through to the 15th centuries. Its initial role is unclear; he was probably the Byzantine emperor's private secretary. In time, the office also exercised judicial duties. It became an important fiscal official in the Komnenian period, and remained one of the highest-ranking state offices into the Palaiologan period as well.

== History and functions ==
The office first appears in the reign of Emperor Basil I the Macedonian (r. 867–886), when it was held by Leo Choirosphaktes. The original function of the office is unclear. Franz Dölger regarded the mystikos as the emperor's private secretary, while Nicolas Oikonomides considered him already at that stage as a judicial official.

Due to their proximity to the emperor, the holders of the office had considerable power. Already under Emperor Leo VI the Wise (r. 886–912), a mystikos became Patriarch of Constantinople: Nicholas I Mystikos. Trusted by the emperors, the mystikoi are thus attested as occupying various important offices: at times they exercised the duties of a protasekretis (head of the chancery), various judicial duties, or served as heads of the establishment of the imperial bedchamber (koiton). The office rose to particular prominence under Emperor Manuel I Komnenos (r. 1143–1180), when the mystikos was given charge of the imperial palace and the emperor's private treasury, thus controlling not only the flow of salaries to the various imperial officials, but also the patronage and donations from the imperial purse to the Church. The office remained important in the 13th century, when at least one of its holders held the rank of sebastos. The title's functions at this time, however, are again unclear. The office remains attested up to the end of the Byzantine Empire in the 15th century.

== Derivative offices ==
In the 10th and 11th centuries, a number of offices were based on the term mystikos. The protomystikos (πρωτομυστικός, "first mystikos") is attested in 1057 as a senior judicial official. Furthermore, the posts of mystographos (μυστογράφος) and mystolektes (μυστολέκτης) are frequently attested in seals. The former is first attested in 911/2 and was extant until c. 1100, when it was probably abolished by Emperor Alexios I Komnenos (r. 1081–1118). He was possibly the assistant of the mystikos, since he follows right after him in the list of offices of the Escorial Taktikon, written around 975, and its holders' seals pair the title with positions as notaries and judicial officials. The office of mystolektes is chiefly attested in seals of the 11th and 12th centuries. Along with notarial and judicial posts, its holders are also linked in seals with positions within the court itself.

== Sources ==
- Kazhdan, Alexander, ed. (1991). The Oxford Dictionary of Byzantium. Oxford and New York: Oxford University Press. ISBN 0-19-504652-8.
- Macrides, Ruth (2007). George Akropolites: The History – Introduction, Translation and Commentary. Oxford: Oxford University Press. ISBN 978-0-19-921067-1.
- Magdalino, Paul (1984). "The Not-so-secret Functions of the Mystikos". Revue des études byzantines. 42 (42): 229–240. doi:10.3406/rebyz.1984.2158.
- Magdalino, Paul (1994). "Justice and Finance in the Byzantine State, Ninth to Twelfth Centuries". In Laiou, Angeliki E.; Simon, Dieter (eds.). Law and Society in Byzantium, 9th-12th Centuries. Washington, DC: Dumbarton Oaks. pp. 93–116. ISBN 0-88402-222-6.
- Magdalino, Paul (2002) [1993]. The Empire of Manuel I Komnenos, 1143–1180. Cambridge: Cambridge University Press. ISBN 0-521-52653-1.
