= Constantine Harmenopoulos =

14th-century Byzantine jurist

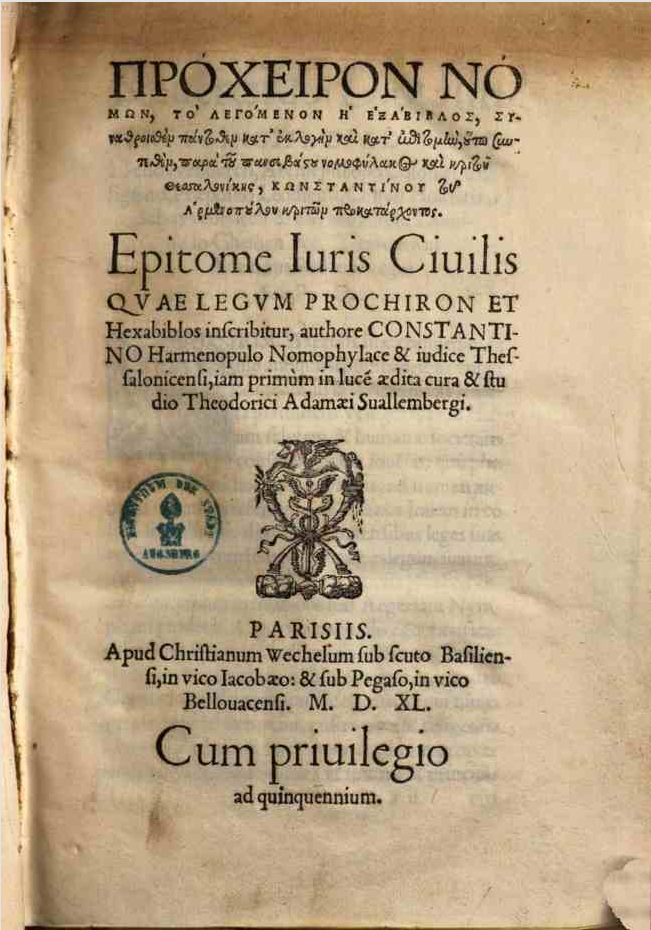
Hexabiblos by Armenopoulos - 1540.png

Constantine Harmenopoulos (Greek: Κωνσταντῖνος Ἁρμενόπουλος; 1320 – c. 1385) was a Byzantine jurist of Armenian descent who held the post of katholikos kritēs ("universal judge") of Thessalonica, one of the highest judicial offices in the Byzantine Empire.

He is best known for his Hexabiblos (1344–1345), a law book in six volumes in which he compiles a wide range of Byzantine legal sources. First printed Paris in 1540, the Hexabiblos was widely adopted in the Balkans under the Ottoman Empire. In 1828, it was also adopted as the interim civil code in the newly independent Greek state.
