= Kabbadion =

Caftan-like garment commonly worn in the Byzantine Empire

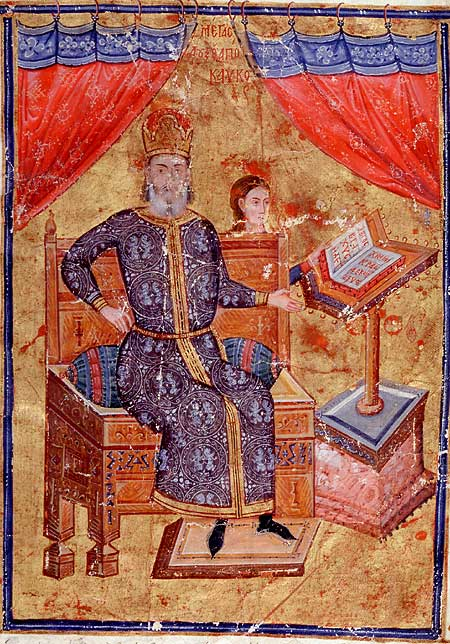
The megas doux Alexios Apokaukos in the garb of his office, including a richly-decorated blue kabbadion

The kabbadion (Greek: καββάδιον) was a caftan-like garment of oriental origin which became a standard part of court costume in the last centuries of the Byzantine Empire.

The first known reference to the kabbadion occurs in the Kletorologion of 899, where it is mentioned as the dress of the barbarian (ethnikoi) members of the Emperor's bodyguard, the Hetaireia. It re-appears in the mid-14th century in the Book of Offices of pseudo-Kodinos as the standard ceremonial dress for almost all court members. Kodinos describes it as an "Persians" clearly indicating a provenance from the Islamic world. It is therefore usually equated with the long, caftan-like and full-sleeved tunic worn by various Byzantine officials in depictions of the 13th–15th centuries. It fastened down the front and was worn with a belt. Its colour and decoration were determined by rank, as described by Kodinos; it was usually richly decorated with gold embroideries on the collar and on borders along the sleeves and hem, and could be adorned with pearls.

== Sources ==
- Parani, Maria G. (2003). Reconstructing the Reality of Images: Byzantine Material Culture and Religious Iconography (11th to 15th Centuries). Leiden: Brill. pp. 60–61. ISBN 978-90-04-12462-2.
- Patterson Ševčenko, Nancy (1991). "Kabbadion". In Kazhdan, Alexander (ed.). The Oxford Dictionary of Byzantium. New York and Oxford: Oxford University Press. p. 1088. ISBN 978-0-19-504652-6.
