= George Kodinos =

Byzantine historian

George Kodinos (Greek: Γεώργιος Κωδινός), also Pseudo-Kodinos or Codinus, is the conventional name of an anonymous late 15th-century author of late Byzantine literature.

Their attribution to him is only traditional, and is based on the fact that all three works come in the same manuscript. The works referred to are the following:

1. Patria (Πάτρια Κωνσταντινουπόλεως), treating of the history, topography, and monuments of Constantinople. It is divided into five sections: (a) the foundation of the city; (b) its situation, limits and topography; (c) its statues, works of art, and other notable sights; (d) its buildings; (e) and the construction of the Hagia Sophia. It was written in the reign of Basil II (976-1025), revised and rearranged under Alexios I Komnenos (1081–1118), and perhaps copied by Codinus, whose name it bears in some (later) manuscripts. The chief sources are: the Patria of Hesychius Illustrius of Miletus, the anonymous Parastaseis syntomoi chronikai, and an anonymous account (ἔκφρασις) of St Sophia (ed. Theodor Preger in Scriptores originum Constantinopolitanarum, fasc. i, 1901, followed by the Patria of Codinus). Procopius, De Aedificiis and the poem of Paulus Silentiarius on the dedication of St. Sophia should be read in connexion with this subject.
2. De Officiis (Τακτικὸν περὶ τῶν ὀφφικίων τοῦ Παλατίου Κωνσταντινουπόλεως καὶ τῶν ὀφφικίων τῆς Μεγάλης Ἐκκλησίας), a treatise, written between 1347 and 1368, of the court and higher ecclesiastical dignities and of the ceremonies proper to different occasions, as they had evolved by the middle Palaiologan period. It should be compared with the earlier De Ceremoniis of Constantine Porphyrogenitus and other Taktika of the 9th and 10th centuries .
3. A chronological outline of events from the beginning of the world to the Fall of Constantinople to the Ottomans.

Complete editions are (by Immanuel Bekker) in the Corpus Scriptorum Historiae Byzantinae vol. 14–15, where, however, some sections of the Patria are omitted), and in JP Migne, Patrologia Graeca (vol. 157).; see also Karl Krumbacher, Geschichte der byzantinischen Litteratur (1897).

== Sources ==
- Macrides, Ruth J.; Munitiz, Joseph A.; Angelov, Dimiter (2013). Pseudo-Kodinos and the Constantinopolitan Court: Offices and Ceremonies. Farnham, Surrey: Ashgate. ISBN 978-0-7546-6752-0.
- Kazhdan, Alexander, ed. (1991). "Pseudo-Kodinos". The Oxford Dictionary of Byzantium. Oxford University Press. p. 1135.
