= Protoierakarios =

Byzantine office of "first falconer"

The prōtoierakarios or prōtohierakarios (Greek: πρωτοϊερακάριος, "first falconer"), also prōthierakarios (πρωθιερακάριος), was a Byzantine court office and honorific title in the 13th–15th centuries.

== History and functions ==
The office first appears in the 13th-century Empire of Nicaea, although it clearly had earlier antecedents. Hunting was a particular passion of Byzantine emperors, and falconry in became increasingly popular among the upper classes from the 11th century on, judged from the references in literary sources and the appearance of manuals on falconry. In the 14th century, Andronikos III Palaiologos (r. 1328–1341) is said to have maintained over a thousand hunting dogs and over a thousand falcons.

In the Book of Offices written by pseudo-Kodinos in the middle of the 14th century, the post occupies the 48th place in the imperial hierarchy, between the logothetēs tou stratiōtikou and the logothetēs tōn agelōn. The French scholar Rodolphe Guilland suggested that it was closely associated with the prōtokynēgos ("first huntsman"), who was in the 41st place, and that holders of the former office were promoted to the latter. According to pseudo-Kodinos, his functions were to supervise the keepers of the falcons. As a sign of this he bore a left-hand gauntlet on his belt, decorated with gold braid and purple eagles. His uniform was otherwise typical of the mid-level courtiers: a gold-brocaded hat (skiadion), a plain silk kabbadion, and a skaranikon (domed hat) covered in golden and lemon-yellow silk and decorated with gold wire and images of the emperor in front and rear, respectively depicted enthroned and on horseback. The office could be held by more than one person at the same time.

The lowly rank and obscure charge of the position means that its holders are not often attested in the sources.

== List of known prōtoierakarioi ==
Name	Tenure	Appointed by	Notes	Refs
Theodore Mouzalon	1254–1258	Theodore II Laskaris	Eldest brother of the emperor's favourite, George Mouzalon, according to Pachymeres he was raised to the rank as a sign of favour to him and his brothers, who had been companions of Theodore II as children. George Akropolites and Nikephoros Gregoras on the other hand report that he was named prōtokynēgos, perhaps reflecting a later promotion.	
Constantine Chadenos	c. 1274	Michael VIII Palaiologos	Previously komēs tōn basilikōn hippōn, general comptroller (megas logariastēs), Eparch of Constantinople, and pansebastos sebastos.	
Abrampax	late 13th century	Andronikos II Palaiologos	Possibly a rendering of the Muslim name Ibrahim.	
Basilikos	c. 1300	Andronikos II Palaiologos	Unknown first name. Addressee of poems by Manuel Philes, of Turkish origin, married to the prōtoierakaria Melane. Erroneously identified by Guilland with Demetrios Palaiologos (below).	
[Leo] Bouzenos	13th or 14th century	unknown	Promoted to prōtokynēgos, known solely from his seal.	
Demetrios Palaiologos	first third of 14th century	Andronikos II Palaiologos (?)	Manuel Philes wrote a funerary oration for him. Uncle of the renegade Seljukid prince Demetrios Soultanos.	
Sarantenos	c. 1325–1328	Andronikos III Palaiologos	Unknown first name. Landowner near Berroia, relative of the skouterios Theodore Sarantenos.	
John Synadenos	before 1341	Andronikos III Palaiologos	Garrison commander of Constantinople in 1328. He served as prōtoierakarios sometime before his death in May 1341.	
Iagoupes	c. 1344	John V Palaiologos	Attested as prōtoierakarios at Thessalonica in 1344.	
Demetrios Komes	c. 1344	John V Palaiologos	Attested as prōtoierakarios at Thessalonica in 1344.	
Theodore Strongylos	1348	John VI Kantakouzenos	Attested at Constantinople in 1348.	

== See also ==
- Medieval hunting
- Grand Falconer of France

== Sources ==
- Guilland, Rodolphe (1967). "Dignitaires des XIV^{e} et XV^{e} siècles". Recherches sur les institutions byzantines, Tome I (in French). Berlin: Akademie-Verlag. pp. 594–607.
- Kazhdan, Alexander, ed. (1991). The Oxford Dictionary of Byzantium. Oxford and New York: Oxford University Press. ISBN 0-19-504652-8.
- Macrides, Ruth (2007). George Akropolites: The History – Introduction, Translation and Commentary. Oxford: Oxford University Press. ISBN 978-0-19-921067-1.
- Trapp, Erich; Beyer, Hans-Veit; Walther, Rainer; Sturm-Schnabl, Katja; Kislinger, Ewald; Leontiadis, Ioannis; Kaplaneres, Sokrates (1976–1996). Prosopographisches Lexikon der Palaiologenzeit (in German). Vienna: Verlag der Österreichischen Akademie der Wissenschaften. ISBN 3-7001-3003-1.
- Verpeaux, Jean, ed. (1966). Pseudo-Kodinos, Traité des Offices (in French). Centre National de la Recherche Scientifique.
