= Constantine Chadenos =

Constantine Chadenos (Greek: Κωνσταντῖνος Χαδηνὸς) was a senior Byzantine official active in the third quarter of the 13th century.

He is first mentioned in 1258, when he was sent by Emperor Theodore II Laskaris (reigned 1254–58) to Thessalonica to arrest Michael Palaiologos (the future Michael VIII, r. 1259–82), who plotted against the emperor. At the time, he held the post of Count of the Imperial Horses (κόμης τῶν βασιλικῶν ἲππων). After Michael Palaiologos ascended the throne, in ca. 1261 he was dispatched to enrol the large landholders of Asia Minor into the imperial army and confiscate much of their property. At about the same time, he was also named Eparch of Constantinople. In 1269 he is attested as holding the post of general comptroller (megas logariastes) and the designation of oikeios of the emperor, advancing further to the post of first falconer (protohierakarios) by 1274.

== Sources ==
- Guilland, Rodolphe (1967). "Le Grand connétable". Recherches sur les institutions byzantines, Tome I (in French). Berlin, Germany: Akademie-Verlag. pp. 469–477.
- Trapp, Erich; Beyer, Hans-Veit; Walther, Rainer; Sturm-Schnabl, Katja; Kislinger, Ewald; Leontiadis, Ioannis; Kaplaneres, Sokrates (1976–1996). Prosopographisches Lexikon der Palaiologenzeit (in German). Vienna: Verlag der Österreichischen Akademie der Wissenschaften. ISBN 3-7001-3003-1.
