= Phile =

Phile or Philes may refer to:

- Phile (politician), a magistrate in Ancient Greece
- Phile, a misspelling of computer file, seen in BBS hacker culture
- Alexios Philes, Byzantine general
- Manuel Philes, Byzantine poet
- Theodore Philes, Byzantine governor
