= Skouterios =

Byzantine emperor's standard- and shield-bearer

The skouterios (Greek: σκουτέριος, "shield-bearer") was a Byzantine court office in the 13th–14th centuries, whose role was to carry the emperor's personal standard, the divellion.

== History and functions ==
The office is very obscure, and is rarely mentioned in the sources. Although it is attested from the 13th century on in the Empire of Nicaea, most of what is known about it comes from the Book of Offices, written by pseudo-Kodinos in the middle of the 14th century. According to pseudo-Kodinos, the skouterios was responsible for bearing the emperor's banner, the so-called divellion (διβέλλιον) and the emperor's shield (σκουτάριον, skoutarion), not only in ceremonial processions, but whenever the emperor went about in public, including on campaign. The skouterios preceded the emperor, and the Varangian Guard followed behind the divellion. In imperial ceremonies, a number of other standards were also used, but the skouterios and the divellion always preceded them. The only exception was when the emperor visited a monastery, where the imperial bootmaker carried the divellion; the reason for this custom was unknown even to Kodinos.

In pseudo-Kodinos' work, the post occupies the 42nd place in the imperial hierarchy, between the prōtokynēgos and the amēralios. His court uniform was typical of the mid-level courtiers: a gold-brocaded hat (skiadion), a plain silk kabbadion, and a skaranikon (domed hat) covered in golden and lemon-yellow silk and decorated with gold wire and images of the emperor in front and rear, respectively depicted enthroned and on horseback.

From the few holders known, the post was given to military commanders and fiscal officials. The term is also attested as a family name in Chalcidice, Constantinople, as well as in Trebizond.

== List of known skouterioi ==
| Name | Tenure | Appointed by | Notes | Refs |
|---|---|---|---|---|
| Xyleas | c. 1256–1257 | Theodore II Laskaris | A veteran soldier and highly esteemed by Theodore II, he was charged with defending the fortress of Prilep when the emperor was obliged to return to Asia Minor in 1256. In 1257 he operated in the region of Pelagonia, where he was defeated by the Serbs. | |
| Kapandrites | late 13th/early 14th century | Andronikos II Palaiologos (?) | Had two sons, George and an unnamed one, both of whom held the same office. | |
| Choumnos | c. 1306 | Andronikos II Palaiologos | Along with the pinkernēs Angelos Sennachereim, he successfully defended Adrianople against a siege by the Catalan Company. | |
| Kapandrites | first half of the 14th century | unknown | Son of the skouterios Kapandrites. Known from a funerary poem by Manuel Philes on his mother, where he is described as an "unshakeable" soldier. | |
| George Kapandrites | first half of the 14th century | unknown | Son of the skouterios Kapandrites, he died of the Black Death as a boy. Unclear whether he held the office. He is known from the cover of his tomb in Thessaloniki. | |
| Nikon Kapandrites | first half of the 14th century | unknown | The front of his sarcophagus survives in the Church of St. Nicholas Orphanos in Thessaloniki, which he may have founded. | |
| Theodore Kapantrites | c. 1325 | Andronikos II Palaiologos | Oikeios of the emperor and pansebastos sebastos, possibly identical with the younger unnamed Kapandrites as the mothers of both hailed from Berroia. | |
| Theodore Sarantenos | c. 1324–1325 | Andronikos II Palaiologos | Landowner in the region of Berroia, oikeios of the emperor and pansebastos. His children all died before him. Died as a monk in the Vatopedi monastery in 1330. | |
| George Glabas | c. 1342/43 | John VI Kantakouzenos | Cavalry commander under Kantakouzenos during the Byzantine civil war of 1341–1347. He died in 1343. | |
| Glabas | c. 1343/44 | John VI Kantakouzenos (?) | He died in 1343/44. Likely identical with the megas dioikētēs and katholikos kritēs of the same name, active in 1329–1341. | |
| Senachereim | c. 1344 | John V Palaiologos (?) | Attested in Thessaloniki in 1344 in an act preserved in the Docheiariou Monastery. | |
| Andrew Indanes | before 1351 | unknown | Mentioned in two prostagmata from 1351 concerning land disputes with the Xeropotamou Monastery. | |

== Sources ==
- Guilland, Rodolphe (1969). "Études sur l'histoire administrative de l'Empire byzantin. Sur les titres du Bas-Empire byzantin: préteur du peuple, skoutérios ou porte-bouclier, protokomès ou premier comte". Revue des études sud-est européennes (in French). 7. Bucharest: 81–89.
- Kazhdan, Alexander, ed. (1991). The Oxford Dictionary of Byzantium. Oxford and New York: Oxford University Press. ISBN 0-19-504652-8.
- Macrides, Ruth (2007). George Akropolites: The History – Introduction, Translation and Commentary. Oxford: Oxford University Press. ISBN 978-0-19-921067-1.
- Trapp, Erich; Beyer, Hans-Veit; Walther, Rainer; Sturm-Schnabl, Katja; Kislinger, Ewald; Leontiadis, Ioannis; Kaplaneres, Sokrates (1976–1996). Prosopographisches Lexikon der Palaiologenzeit (in German). Vienna: Verlag der Österreichischen Akademie der Wissenschaften. ISBN 3-7001-3003-1.
- Verpeaux, Jean, ed. (1966). Pseudo-Kodinos, Traité des Offices (in French). Centre National de la Recherche Scientifique.
