= John Vatatzes (disambiguation) =

John III Doukas Vatatzes (died 1254) was Emperor of Nicaea in 1221–1254.

John Vatatzes or Batatzes may also refer to:

- John Komnenos Vatatzes (died 1183), Byzantine general
- John Vatatzes (megas stratopedarches) (died 1345), Byzantine general and official
