= Greek heraldry =

Greek heraldry is the use of heraldic imagery in both ancient and modern Greece. Greek heraldry is not as developed as in Western European nations. Elements of Greek heraldry come from the Byzantine Empire and from the various western powers that have occupied Greek lands. Heraldry is therefore seen as a foreign concept, and is widespread mostly in the Ionian and Aegean Islands (former Venetian and Genoese possessions) and among the families of Phanariot origin.

Ancient Greeks were among the first civilizations to use symbols consistently in order to identify a warrior, clan or a state. In Aeschylus’ tragedy Seven Against Thebes there is the first record of a shield blazon.

== See also ==
- Byzantine heraldry
- Coat of arms of Greece
