= Pinkernes =

High court position in the Byzantine empire

Pinkernes (Ancient Greek: πιγκέρνης, romanized: pinkernēs), sometimes also epinkernes (ἐπιγκέρνης, epinkernēs), was a high Byzantine court position.

The term derives from the Greek verb ἐπικεράννυμι (epikeránnymi, "to mix [wine]"), and was used to denote the cup-bearer of the Byzantine emperor. In addition, descriptive terms such as ὁ τοῡ βασιλέως οἰνοχόος (ho tou basileōs oinochoos, "the emperor's wine-pourer"), ἀρχιοινοχόος (archioinochoos, "chief wine-pourer"), κυλικιφόρος (kylikiphoros, "bearer of the kylix"), and, particularly at the court of the Empire of Nicaea, ὁ ἐπὶ τοῡ κεράσματος (ho epi tou kerasmatos, "the one in charge of the drink") were often used instead. The position is attested already in the Klētorologion of 899, where a pinkernēs of the emperor (πιγκέρνης τοῦ δεσπότου, pinkernēs tou despotou) and of the Augusta (πιγκέρνης τῆς Αὐγούστης, pinkernēs tēs Augoustēs) are listed among the eunuchs of the palace staff. As the name suggests, the principal charge of the pinkernēs was the pouring of wine for the emperor; he accompanied the emperor, bearing a goblet suspended on a chain, which he gave to the emperor when the latter wanted to drink. His position at court was not very high, but he had an extensive staff, the παροινοχόοι (paroinochoi, "assistant wine-pourers"). The post was imitated in the staff of the Patriarch of Constantinople and in the households of great magnates. The spouse of a pinkernēs bore the feminine form of his title: pinkernissa (πιγκέρνισσα).

During the early Komnenian period, the post ceased to be restricted to eunuchs, and gradually became a title of distinction, even awarded to the Byzantine emperor's relatives. Several senior generals of the Palaiologan period, such as Michael Tarchaneiotes Glabas, Alexios Philanthropenos and Syrgiannes Palaiologos, were awarded the title. According to pseudo-Kodinos, in the 14th century, the pinkernēs had risen considerably, and occupied the 14th place in the palace hierarchy, between the prōtosebastos and the kouropalatēs. According to Rodolphe Guilland, this rise to the highest ranks of the emperor's cup-bearer, along with the rise of the masters of the hunt (prōtokynēgos) and of the falcons (prōtoierakarios) is an indication that the Byzantine court of the time resembled more and more the chivalric mores of the Western feudal courts. At the same time, the pinkernēs also had assumed some of the responsibilities of the defunct position of the domestikos epi tēs trapezēs, having under his command some of the domestikoi of the domestikion, the household service. By the 15th century, however, it had apparently become a purely honorific charge, since holders of the post are attested being sent on missions to the provinces.

== Sources ==
- Bury, J. B. (1911). The Imperial Administrative System of the Ninth Century – With a Revised Text of the Kletorologion of Philotheos. London: Oxford University Press. OCLC 1046639111.
- Guilland, Rodolphe (1967). "L'Échanson". Recherches sur les institutions byzantines [Studies on the Byzantine Institutions]. Berliner byzantinische Arbeiten 35 (in French). Vol. I. Berlin and Amsterdam: Akademie-Verlag & Adolf M. Hakkert. OCLC 878894516.
- Kazhdan, Alexander, ed. (1991). The Oxford Dictionary of Byzantium. Oxford and New York: Oxford University Press. ISBN 0-19-504652-8.
