= Divellion =

Personal banner of the Emperor of the Byzantine Empire

Divellion of Emperor Dušan

The divellion or dibellion (Greek: διβέλλιον) was a symbol of the late Byzantine Empire, the Emperor's personal banner. It was carried by the skouterios ("shield-bearer"), alongside the Imperial shield, on official events. Emperor Stefan Dušan of Serbia (r. 1331–55) also adopted the Imperial divellion, which was purple and had a golden cross in the center.

== See also ==
- Byzantine flags and insignia
- Labarum

== Sources ==
- Hendry, Michael F. (1966). "Imperial Insignia". Catalogue of the Byzantine Coins in the Dumbarton Oaks Collection and in the Whittemore Collection. Vol. 4. Dumbarton Oaks. pp. 175–. ISBN 978-0-88402-233-6.
