= Protokynegos =

Byzantine office of "first huntsman"

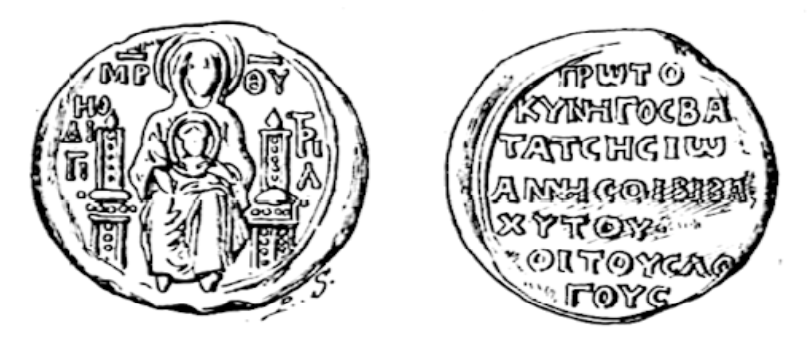
Seal of the 14th-century prōtokynēgos John Vatatzes

The prōtokynēgos (Greek: πρωτοκυνηγός, "first huntsman") was a Byzantine court office and honorific title in the 13th–15th centuries, who was the chief huntsman of the Byzantine emperors.

== History and functions ==
The office first appears in the 13th-century Empire of Nicaea, although it clearly had earlier antecedents; possibly the komēs tou kynēgiou (κόμης τοῡ κυνηγίου. "Count of the Hunt") attested in an undated seal. In the Book of Offices written by pseudo-Kodinos in the middle of the 14th century, the post occupies the 41st place in the imperial hierarchy, between the megas logariastēs and the skouterios. Rodolphe Guilland suggested that it was closely associated with the prōtoierakarios ("first falconer"), who was in the 48th place, and that holders of the latter office were promoted to the former. Hunting was a particular passion of Byzantine emperors; in the 14th century, Andronikos III Palaiologos (r. 1328–1341) is said to have maintained over a thousand hunting dogs and over a thousand falcons.

According to pseudo-Kodinos, his functions were to hold the stirrups for the emperor when he mounted his horse, and to lead the hunters (σκυλλόμαγγοι, skyllomangoi). He enjoyed a peculiar privilege: if during the hunt, one of the emperor's garments became smeared with blood, the prōtokynēgos received it as a gift. His court uniform consisted of a gold-brocaded hat (skiadion), a plain silk kabbadion, and a skaranikon (domed hat) covered in golden and lemon-yellow silk and decorated with gold wire and images of the emperor in front and rear, respectively depicted enthroned and on horseback.

The lowly rank and obscure charge of the position means that its holders are not often attested. However, the title was also given by the emperors as a mark of distinction to officials or military commanders. This gave the holders of the title a place in the court hierarchy, but was not an active charge.

== List of known prōtokynegoi ==
Name	Tenure	Appointed by	Notes	Refs
Theodore Mouzalon	1254–1258	Theodore II Laskaris	Eldest brother of the emperor's favourite, George Mouzalon, according to George Akropolites and Nikephoros Gregoras he was raised to the rank as a sign of favour to him and his brothers, who had been companions of Theodore II as children. Pachymeres on the other hand reports that he was named prōtoierakarios, perhaps reflecting an earlier post.	
[Leo] Bouzenos	13th or 14th century	unknown	Promoted from prōtoierakarios, known solely from his seal.	
Raoul	early 14th century	Andronikos II Palaiologos (?)	Unknown first name. Known solely through the works of the court poet Manuel Philes.	
Sarantenos Indanes	c. 1300	Andronikos III Palaiologos	Mentioned in an act preserved in the Great Lavra Monastery as holder of a pronoia in Chalcidice in 1300.	
Kontophre	c. 1329	Andronikos III Palaiologos	His name is a rendering of the name Godefroi. He was prōtokynēgos and governor of Mesothynia, and advised the emperor on how best to deal with the Ottoman Turks. He was still alive in 1346.	
Sarantenos	c. 1330	Andronikos III Palaiologos	Mentioned only in an act preserved in the Zographou Monastery as the father of Sophrosyne Sarantene and Xene Indanina Sarantene.	
John Vatatzes	1333–1343	Andronikos III Palaiologos	Of lowly birth, Vatazes was originally a partisan of the anti-Kantakouzenos regency in the civil war. In 1341–1342 and again in 1343 he defected to John VI Kantakouzenos, who named him megas stratopedarchēs. He was killed by Turkish mercenaries at Garella in 1345. His son was married to the daughter of Patriarch John XIV Kalekas, and his two daughters were married to the son of the megas doux Alexios Apokaukos, and to the emir of the Karasids, Suleyman.	
Alyates	before 1348	unknown	Unknown first name. Known only through a legal case concerning the dowry of his first wife.	
Rizas	c. 1361 or earlier	unknown	Unknown first name. Prōtokynēgos and landowner on the island of Lemnos.	

== See also ==
- Medieval hunting
- Grand Huntsman of France

== Sources ==
- Guilland, Rodolphe (1967). "Dignitaires des XIV^{e} et XV^{e} siècles". Recherches sur les institutions byzantines, Tome I (in French). Berlin: Akademie-Verlag. pp. 594–607.
- Kazhdan, Alexander, ed. (1991). The Oxford Dictionary of Byzantium. Oxford and New York: Oxford University Press. ISBN 0-19-504652-8.
- Macrides, Ruth (2007). George Akropolites: The History – Introduction, Translation and Commentary. Oxford: Oxford University Press. ISBN 978-0-19-921067-1.
- Trapp, Erich; Beyer, Hans-Veit; Walther, Rainer; Sturm-Schnabl, Katja; Kislinger, Ewald; Leontiadis, Ioannis; Kaplaneres, Sokrates (1976–1996). Prosopographisches Lexikon der Palaiologenzeit (in German). Vienna: Verlag der Österreichischen Akademie der Wissenschaften. ISBN 3-7001-3003-1.
- Verpeaux, Jean, ed. (1966). Pseudo-Kodinos, Traité des Offices (in French). Centre National de la Recherche Scientifique.
