= Byzantine flags and insignia =

For most of its history, the Eastern Roman (Byzantine) Empire did not use heraldry in the Western European sense of permanent motifs transmitted through hereditary right. Various large aristocratic families employed certain symbols to identify themselves; the use of the cross, and of icons of Christ, the Theotokos and various saints is also attested on seals of officials, but these were often personal rather than family emblems. Likewise, various emblems (Greek: σημεῖα, sēmeia; sing. σημεῖον, sēmeion) were used in official occasions and for military purposes, such as banners or shields displaying various motifs such as the cross or the labarum. Despite the abundance of pre-heraldic symbols in Byzantine society from the 10th century, only through contact with the Crusaders in the 12th century (when heraldry was becoming systematized in Western Europe), and particularly following the Fourth Crusade (1202–1204) and the establishment of Frankish principalities on Byzantine soil from 1204 onwards, did heraldic uses penetrate in Byzantium. A native Byzantine heraldry began to appear in the middle and lower rungs of aristocratic families in the 14th century, coinciding with the decline of imperial authority and with the fragmentation of political power under the late Palaiologan emperors. However, it never achieved the breadth of adoption, or the systematization, of its Western analogues.

== Imperial insignia ==
=== Single-headed eagle ===
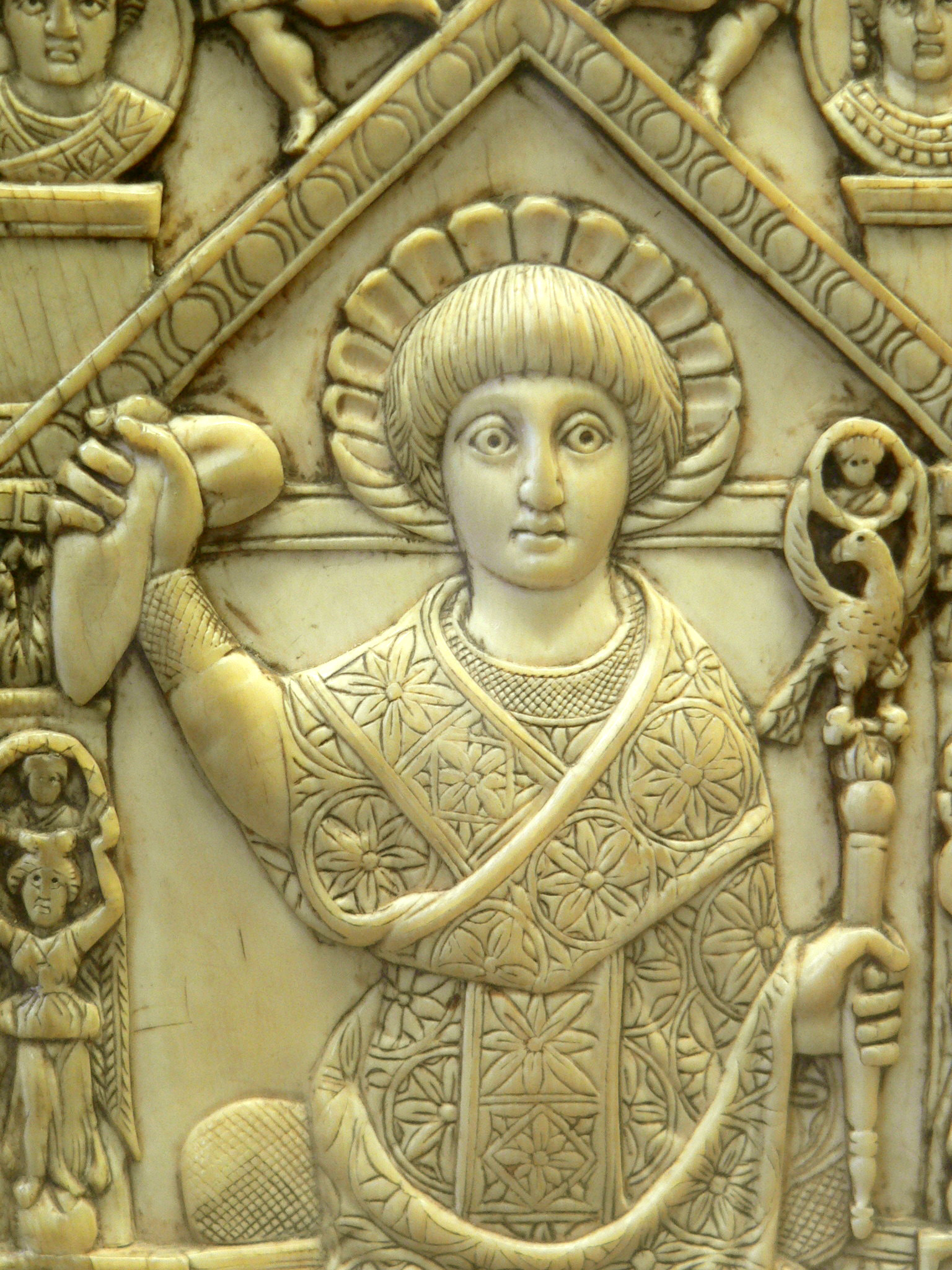
Flavius Anastasius (consul in 517) in consular garb, holding an eagle-topped sceptre.

The single-headed Roman imperial eagle continued to be used in Byzantium, although far more rarely. Thus "eagle-bearers" (ὀρνιθόβορας), descendants of the aquilifers of the Roman legions, are still attested in the 6th century military manual known as the Strategikon of Maurice, although it is unknown whether the standards they carried bore any resemblance to the legionary aquilae. Eagle-topped scepters were a frequent feature of consular diptychs, and appear on coins until the reign of Philippikos Bardanes (r. 711–713). It continued in use in bas-reliefs in churches and funerary monuments until well into the 11th century, however. In the last centuries of the Empire it is recorded as being sewn on imperial garments, and shown in illuminated manuscripts as decorating the cushions (suppedia) on which the emperors stood.

=== Double-headed eagle ===
The emblem mostly associated with the Byzantine Empire is the double-headed eagle. It is of Byzantine invention and the Byzantines themselves used for over 300 years, the last centuries of the Empire. The date of its adoption by the Byzantines has been hotly debated by scholars.

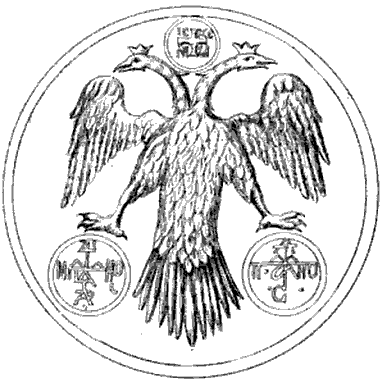
Device of Andronikos II Palaiologos, in the so-called "Flag of Andronikos Palaiologos" kept in the Vatopedi Monastery.

In 1861, the Greek scholar Georgios Chrysovergis wrote that it was adopted by the Komnenoi in 1048. Although this was based on no evidence whatsoever, this view gained wide acceptance and circulation. More careful examination of the primary sources by Spyridon Lambros and August Heisenberg demonstrated that although as a decorative motif the double-headed eagle begins to appear in Byzantine art during the 10th/11th century, it is not securely attested in connection with the emperor until the chrysobull of Andronikos II Palaiologos in 1301, where he is shown on a suppedion decorated with the device. Lambros suggested that it was adopted from Hittite rock-carvings, while A. Soloviev argued in favour of a late adoption around 1288, as a talisman against the first Ottoman successes in Anatolia, as a symbolic gesture reaffirming Byzantine rule over both European and Asian territories.

The Palaiologan emperors used the double-headed eagle as a symbol of the senior members of the imperial family. It was mostly used on clothes and other accoutrements, as codified in the mid-14th century by pseudo-Kodinos in his Book of Offices. According to Kodinos, the emperor bore special boots (tzangia) with eagles made of pearls on both shins and on the instep; the Despots wore similar boots of white and purple, and featured pearl-embroidered eagles on their saddles, while the saddle cloth and their tents were white decorated with red eagles. Similarly, the sebastokrator wore blue boots with golden wire-embroidered eagles on a red background, while his saddle cloth was blue with four red embroidered eagles. The only occasion the double-headed eagle appears on a flag is on the ship that bore Emperor John VIII Palaiologos to the Council of Florence, as mentioned by Sphrantzes and confirmed by its depiction in the Filarete Doors of St. Peter's Basilica. According to a handful of surviving examples, such as the supposed "Flag of Andronikos II Palaiologos" in the Vatopedi Monastery, or a frontispiece of a Bible belonging to Demetrios Palaiologos, the Byzantine double-headed eagle was golden on a red background. Likewise, in Western armorials from the 15th century, the golden double-headed eagle on a red shield is given as the arms of the "Empire of the East" or "of Constantinople", or as emblem of members of the imperial family. The representation of the eagle on a shield is an adaptation to Western heraldic practice, however; the Byzantines never used it in this manner for themselves, although they employed it in a Western context, e.g. in the award of the right to bear the imperial arms to the Florentine citizen Giacomo Paolo di Morellis in 1439. Western European rulers in Greek lands, like Esau de' Buondelmonti and Carlo I Tocco, also impaled their arms with the double-headed eagle as a sign of their status when they received the title of despot from the Byzantine emperors.

Within the Byzantine world, the eagle was also used by the semi-autonomous Despots of the Morea, who were younger imperial princes, and by the Gattilusi of Lesbos, who were Palaiologan relatives and vassals. The double-headed eagle was used in the breakaway Empire of Trebizond as well, being attested imperial clothes but also on flags. Indeed, Western portolans of the 14th–15th centuries use the double-headed eagle (silver/golden on red/vermilion) as the symbol of Trebizond rather than Constantinople. Single-headed eagles are also attested in Trapezuntine coins, and a 1421 source depicts the Trapezuntine flag as yellow with a red single-headed eagle. Apparently, just as in the metropolitan Byzantine state, the use of both motifs, single and double-headed, continued side by side. Double-headed eagle reliefs are also attested for the walls of Trebizond, with one example preserved in a church in Kalamaria, Thessaloniki, which is very similar to 13th-century Seljuq examples. Modern scholars commonly consider the double-headed eagle to have been adopted by the Grand Komnenos emperors of Trebizond after their recognition of the suzerainty of, and intermarriage with, the Palaiologos dynasty in the 1280s. Likewise, the small Byzantine Principality of Theodoro in the Crimean Peninsula, whose rulers conducted marriage alliances with both the Palaiologoi and the Grand Komnenoi, also used the double-headed eagle in the 15th century.

Other Balkan states copied the Byzantine model: chiefly the Serbians, but also the Bulgarians and Epirus under George Kastrioti (better known as Skanderbeg), while after 1472 the eagle was adopted by Muscovy and then Russia. In Western Europe, the Holy Roman Empire likewise adopted the double-headed eagle in the mid-13th century, under Frederick II Hohenstaufen, and used it side by side with the single-headed version. In addition, the double-headed eagle may have been in use in the Latin Empire established after the Fourth Crusade: according to Robert of Clari, the first Latin Emperor, Baldwin of Flanders, wore a cloak embroidered with eagles for his coronation; his daughters used the same device in their arms; and the Byzantine historian Niketas Choniates reports that the Latin emperors struck bronze coins with a double-headed eagle on them.

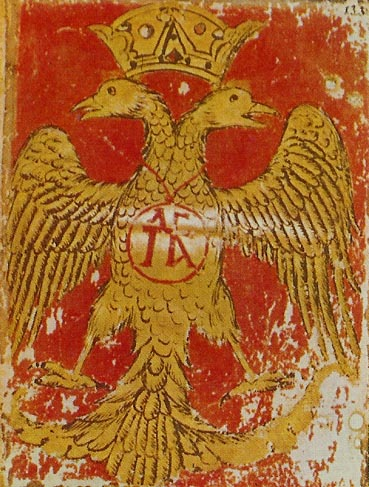
The double-headed eagle with the Palaiologos family monogram (ΠΑΛΓ), from Demetrios Palaiologos' personal bible.

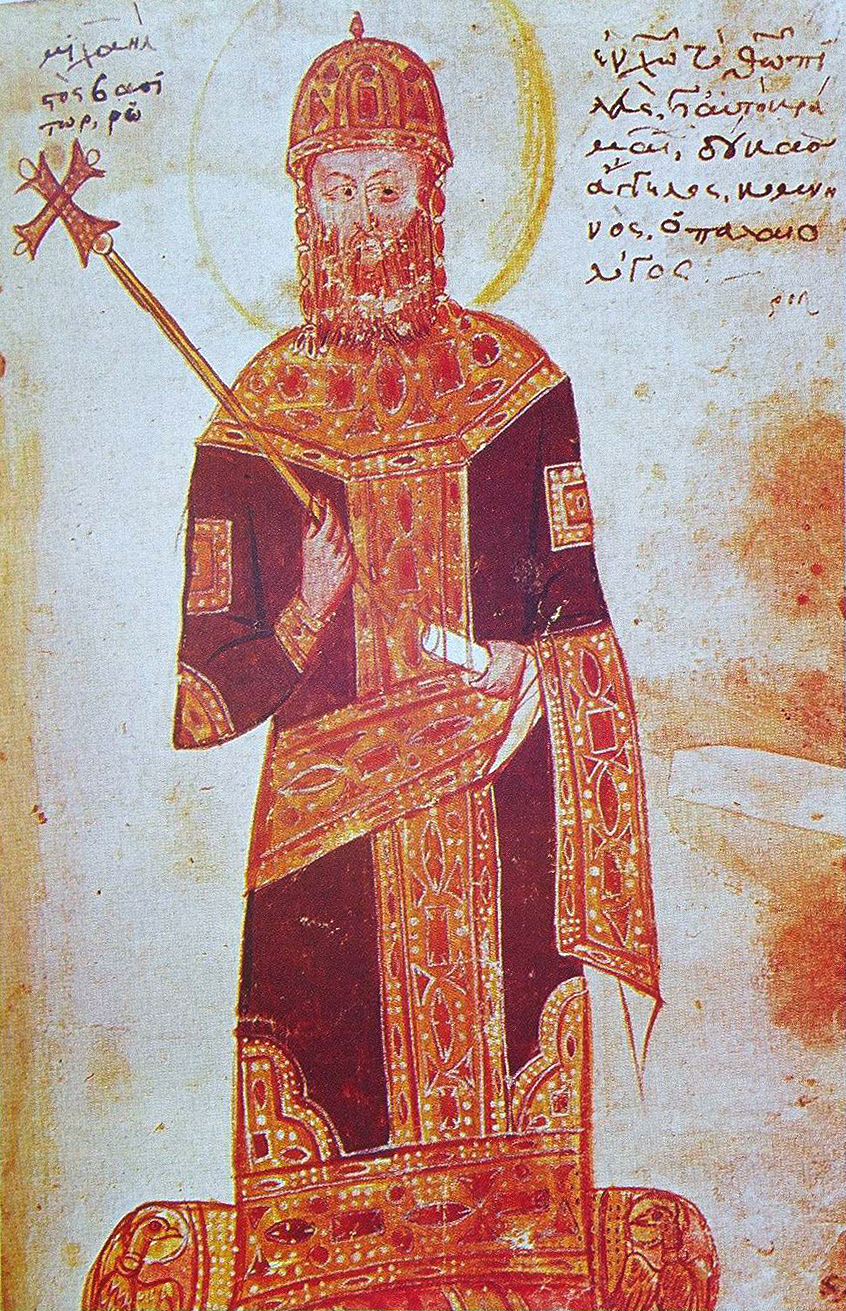
Michael VIII Palaiologos standing on a suppedion decorated with single-headed eagles

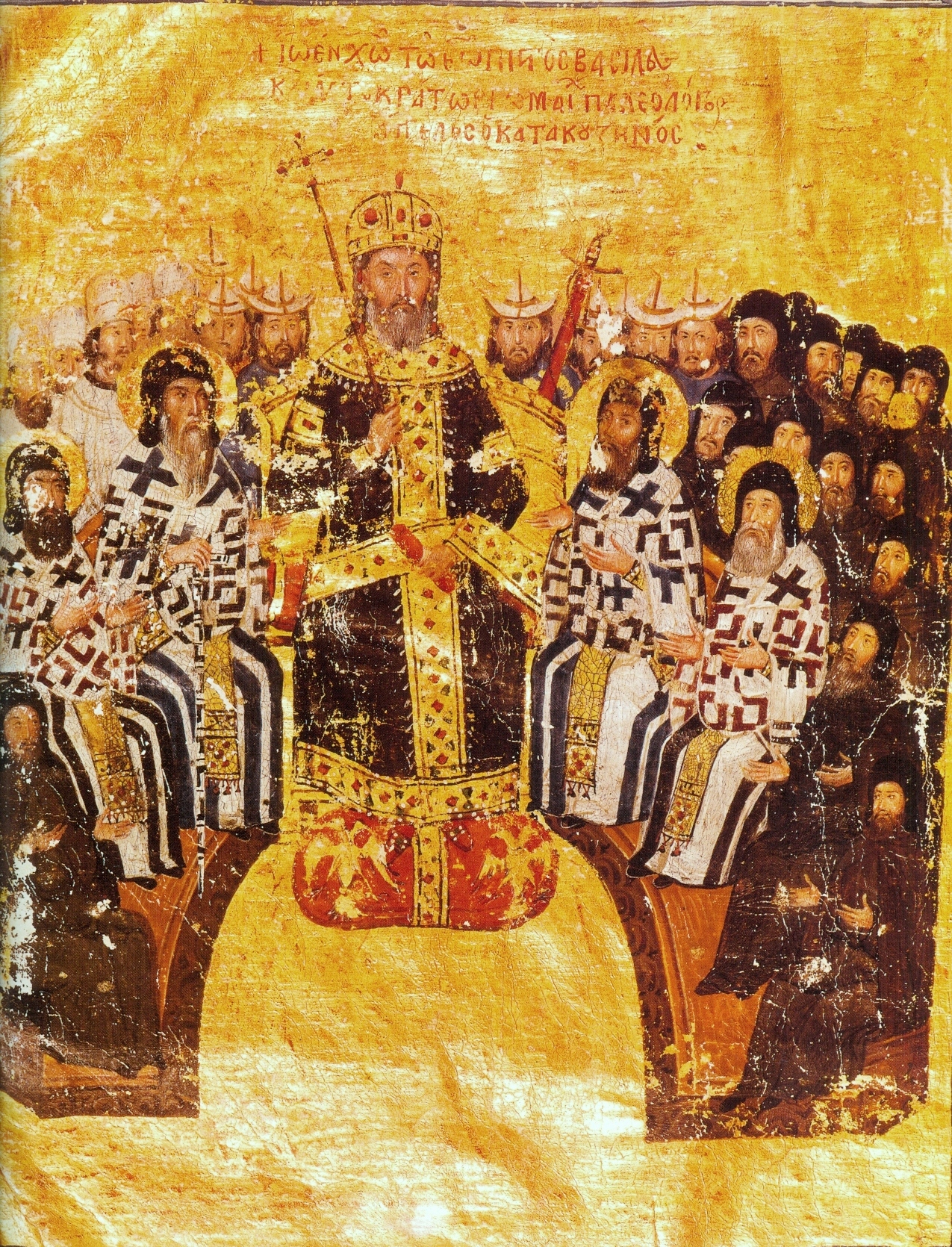
John VI Kantakouzenos standing on a suppedion decorated with gold-embroidered double-headed eagles

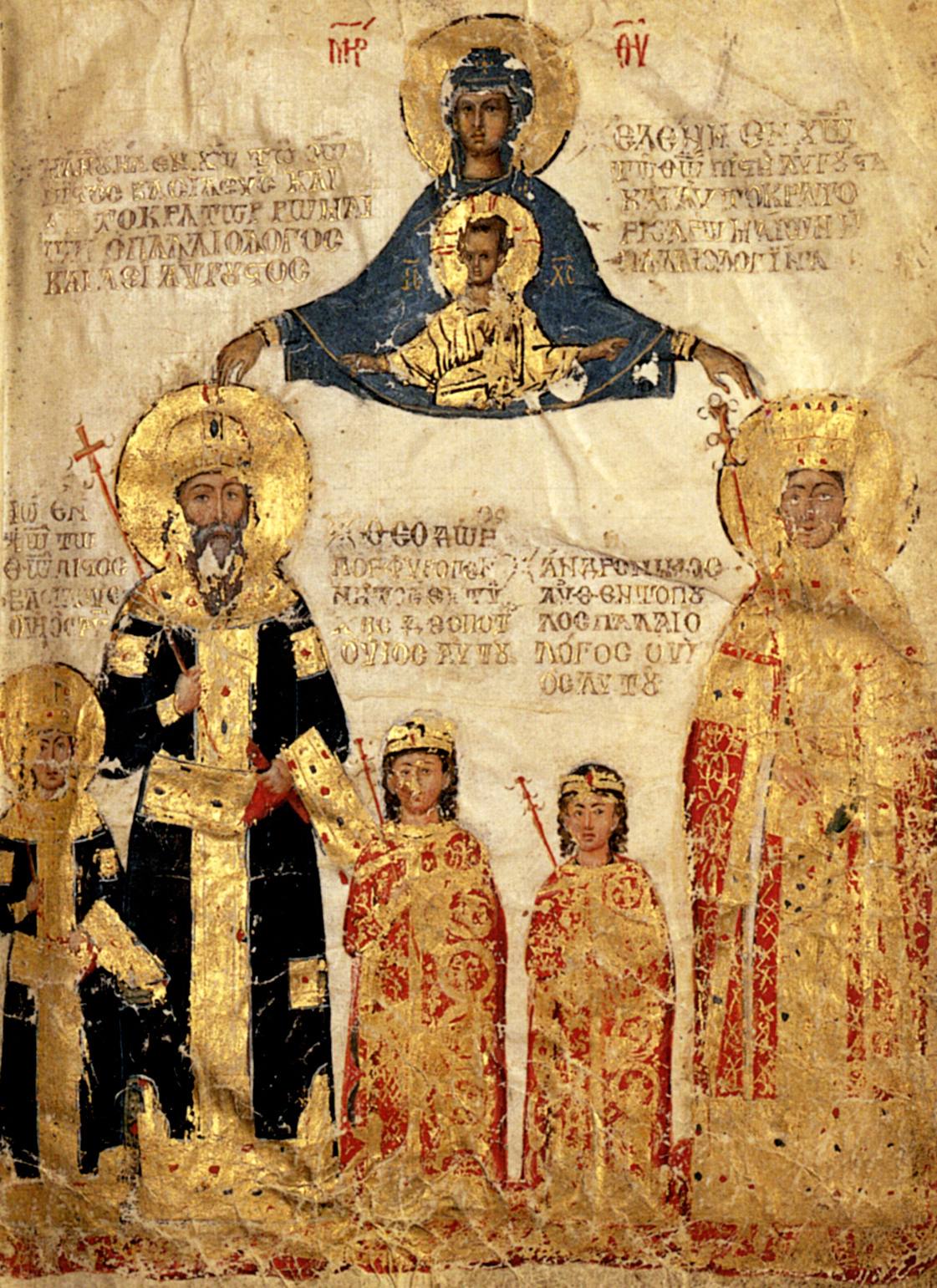
Manuel II Palaiologos with his family. The two younger sons wear red robes with golden double-headed eagles

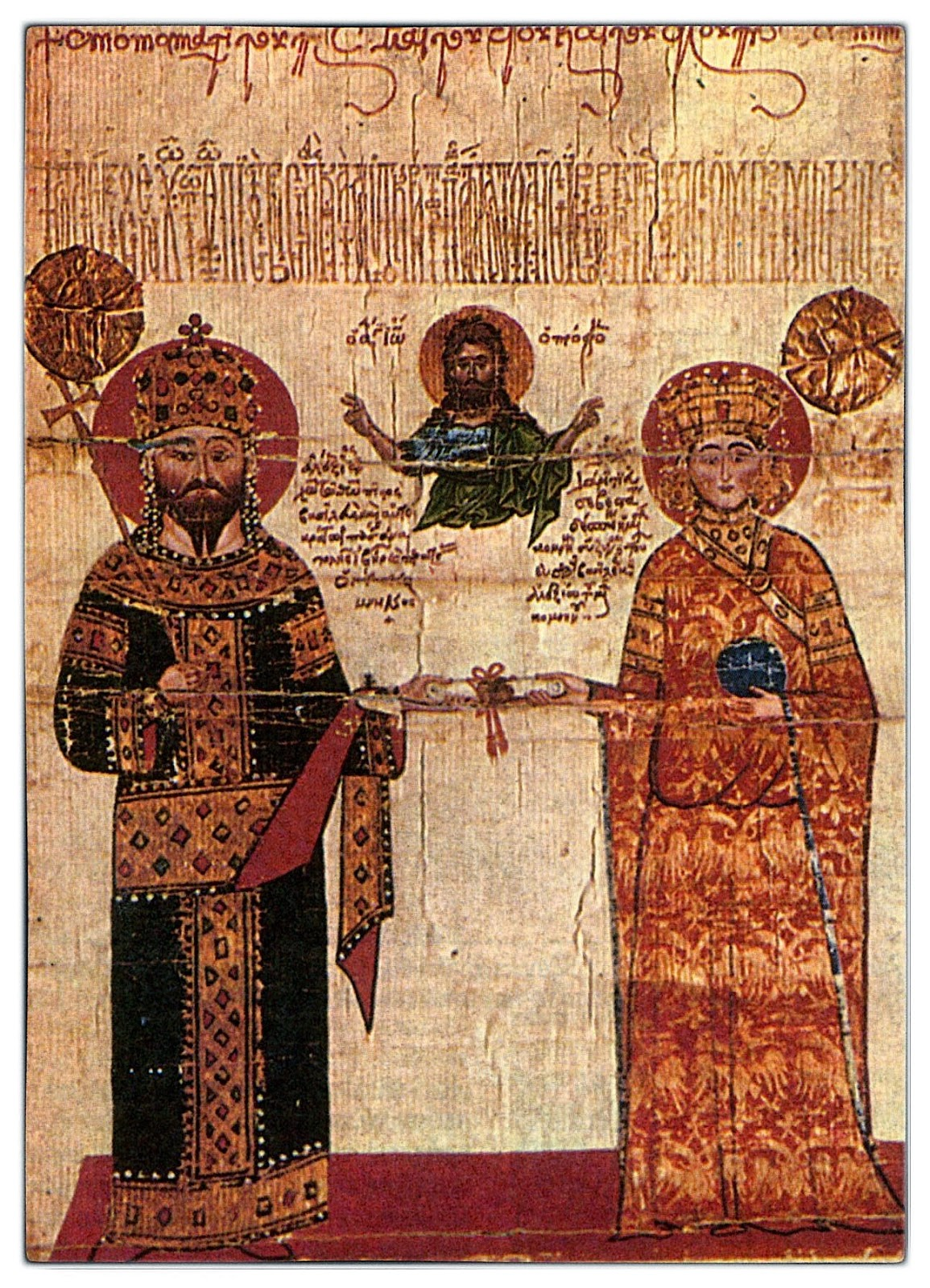
Alexios III of Trebizond and his wife Theodora Kantakouzene, wearing a robe with embroidered golden double-headed eagles

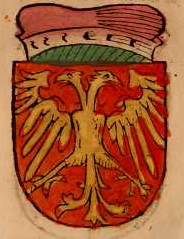
Arms of the despots Michael and Philip Palaiologos, envoys to the Council of Constance, by Ulrich of Richenthal

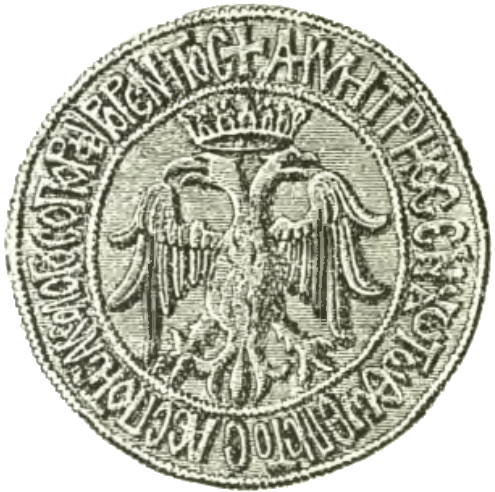
Seal of Demetrios Palaiologos, Despot of the Morea

Banner with the double-headed eagle, used in Western portolans to mark Trebizond in the 14th century

Arms of Carlo I Tocco, Count palatine of Cephalonia and Zakynthos, as Despot of Epirus

=== Tetragrammatic cross ===
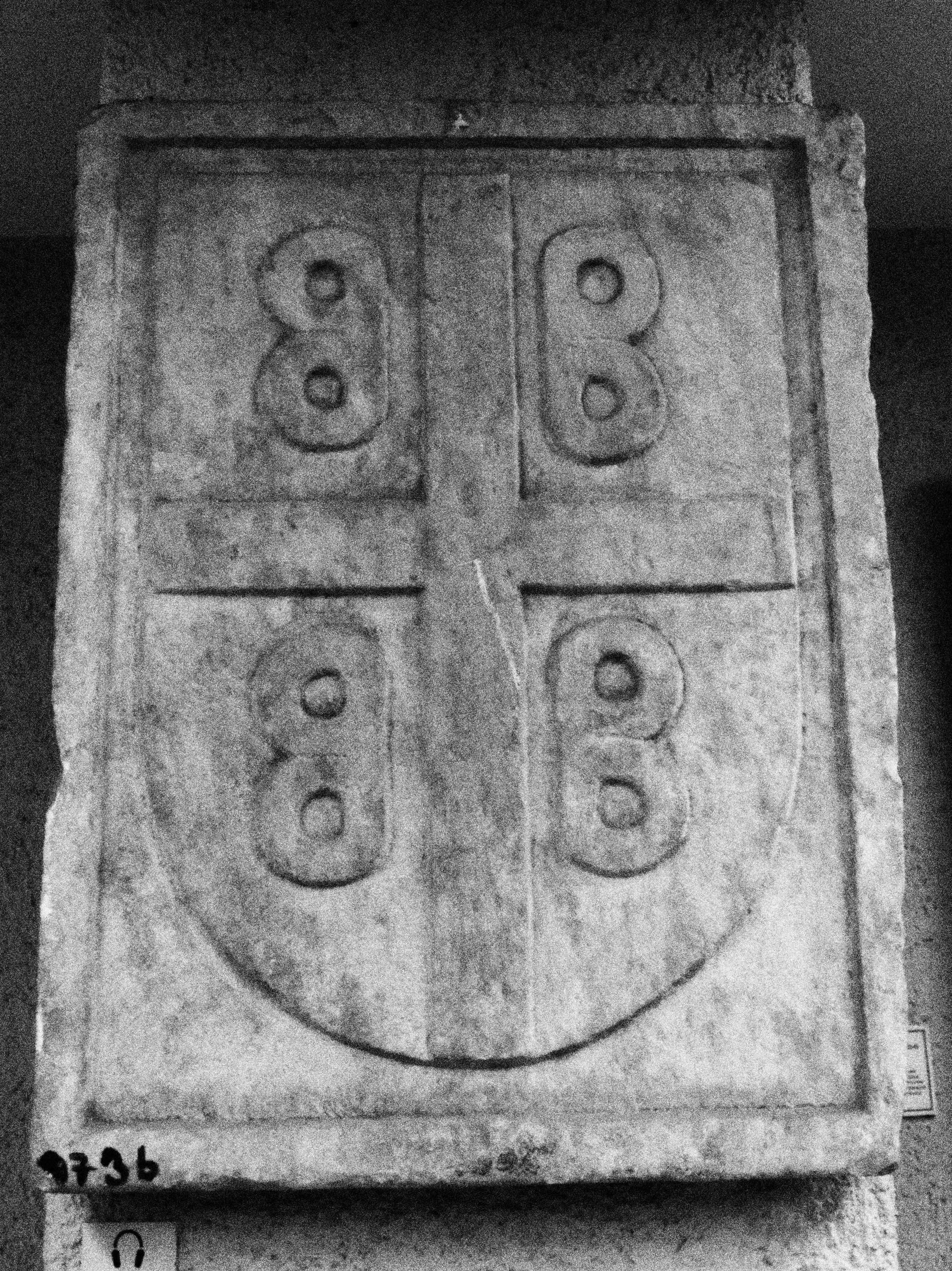
Relief with the tetragrammatic cross as imperial arms, in the Istanbul Archaeological Museum

During the Palaiologan period, the insigne of the reigning dynasty, and the closest thing to a Byzantine "national flag", according to Soloviev, was the so-called "tetragrammatic cross", a gold or silver cross with four letters beta "Β" (often interpreted as firesteels) of the same color, one in each corner.

As an insigne, the cross was already in frequent use in Byzantium since Late Antiquity. Since the 6th century, crosses with quartered letters are known, especially from coinage, forming the acronyms of various invocations, e.g. quartered "X"s for Σταυρὲ Χριστοῦ χάριν χριστιανούς χάριζε Staurè Christou chárin christianoús chárize ("Cross of Christ bestow grace on the Christians") or the letters ϹΒΡΔ for Σταυρὲ σου βοήθει Ρωμανόν δεσπότην Staurè sou boíthei Romanón despótin ("Thy Cross aid the Lord Romanos"). Images of flags with crosses quartered with golden discs survive from the 10th century, and a depiction of a flag almost identical to the Palaiologan design is known from the early 13th century.

The tetragrammatic cross appears with great frequency in the 14th and 15th centuries: it appears on Byzantine coins during the joint rule of Andronikos II Palaiologos and his son Michael IX Palaiologos, on several west-European portolans to designate Constantinople and other Byzantine cities, above one of the windows of the Palace of the Porphyrogenitus, and is described by pseudo-Kodinos as "the customary imperial banner" (basilikon phlamoulon). On coins, the "B"s were often accompanied by circles or stars up to the end of the Empire, while west-European sources sometimes depict the Byzantine flag as a simple gold cross on red, without the "B"s. The symbol was also adopted by Byzantine vassals, like the Gattilusi who ruled Lesbos after 1355, or the Latin lords of Rhodes Vignolo dei Vignoli and Foulques de Villaret. It was placed on the walls of Galata, apparently as a sign of the Byzantine emperor's—largely theoretical—suzerainty over the Genoese colony. Along with the double-headed eagle, the tetragrammatic cross was also adopted as part of their family coat of arms by the cadet line of the Palaiologos dynasty ruling in Montferrat. It was also adopted in Serbia, with slight changes.

The interpretation of the emblem's symbolism hinges on the identification of the four devices either as letters or as firesteels, a dispute where even contemporary sources are inconsistent, and which has led to much scholarly debate since the time of the 17th-century scholars Du Cange and Marcus Vulson de la Colombière. Thus a late 15th-century French source explicitly refers to them as letters, but a mid-14th century Sevillan traveller and pseudo-Kodinos both call them firesteels (πυρέκβολα, pyrekvola, in Greek). Nevertheless, as Philip Grierson points out, the use of letters by the Greeks as symbols was a long-established practice, and their identifications as firesteels by Kodinos probably reflects west-European influence. The two traditional readings of the four "B"s, Βασιλεὺς βασιλέων βασιλεύων βασιλεύουσιν Basileùs basiléon basileúon basileúousin and Βασιλεὺς βασιλέων βασιλευόντων βασιλεύει Basileùs basiléon basileuónton basileúei (both meaning "King of Kings ruling over the kings/rulers") were demonstrated by the Greek archaeologist and numismatist Ioannis Svoronos to be later interpretations by Marcus Vulson de la Colombière. Svoronos himself proposed three alternate readings by incorporating the symbol of the cross into the motto: Σταυρὲ βασιλέως βασιλέων βασιλεῖ βοήθει ("Cross of the King of Kings aid the emperor"), Σταυρὲ βασιλέως βασιλέων βασιλευούσῃ βοήθει Staurè basileùs basiléon basileuoúse boéthei ("Cross of the King of Kings aid the ruling city [Constantinople]"), and Σταυρὲ βασιλέως βασιλέων βασιλεύων βασίλευε Staurè basileùs basiléon basileúon basíleue ("Cross of the King of Kings, rule in reigning"), while the Greek heraldist G. Tipaldos rejected Svoronos' reading and suggested that they represented a repetition of the motto Σταυρέ, βοήθει Staurè, boéthei ("Cross, Come to Our Aid").

Cross quartered with golden discs, the rendition based on the historian Babuin

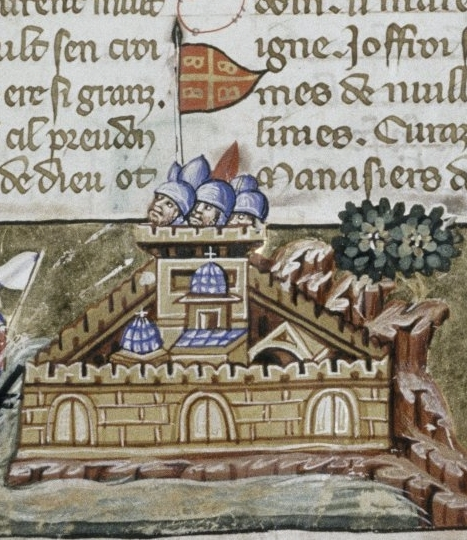
Early 14th-century depiction of Constantinople during the 1204 siege by the Fourth Crusade

Attributed arms of the Latin Empire from the reign of Philip I, who held the title of Latin Emperor of Constantinople from 1273 to 1283

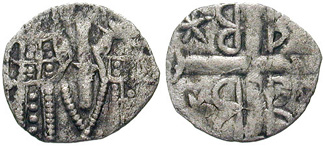
Billon tornese coin from the joint reign of John V Palaiologos and John VI Kantakouzenos (1347–1353)

The tetragrammatic cross emblem of the Palaiologos dynasty, from the 15th-century Harley 6163 manuscript

Imperial banner of the Palaiologos dynasty, as recorded by pseudo-Kodinos and one of the Byzantine flags depicted in the Castilian Conosçimiento de todos los reynos (ca. 1350)

Byzantine flag as shown on some portolan charts

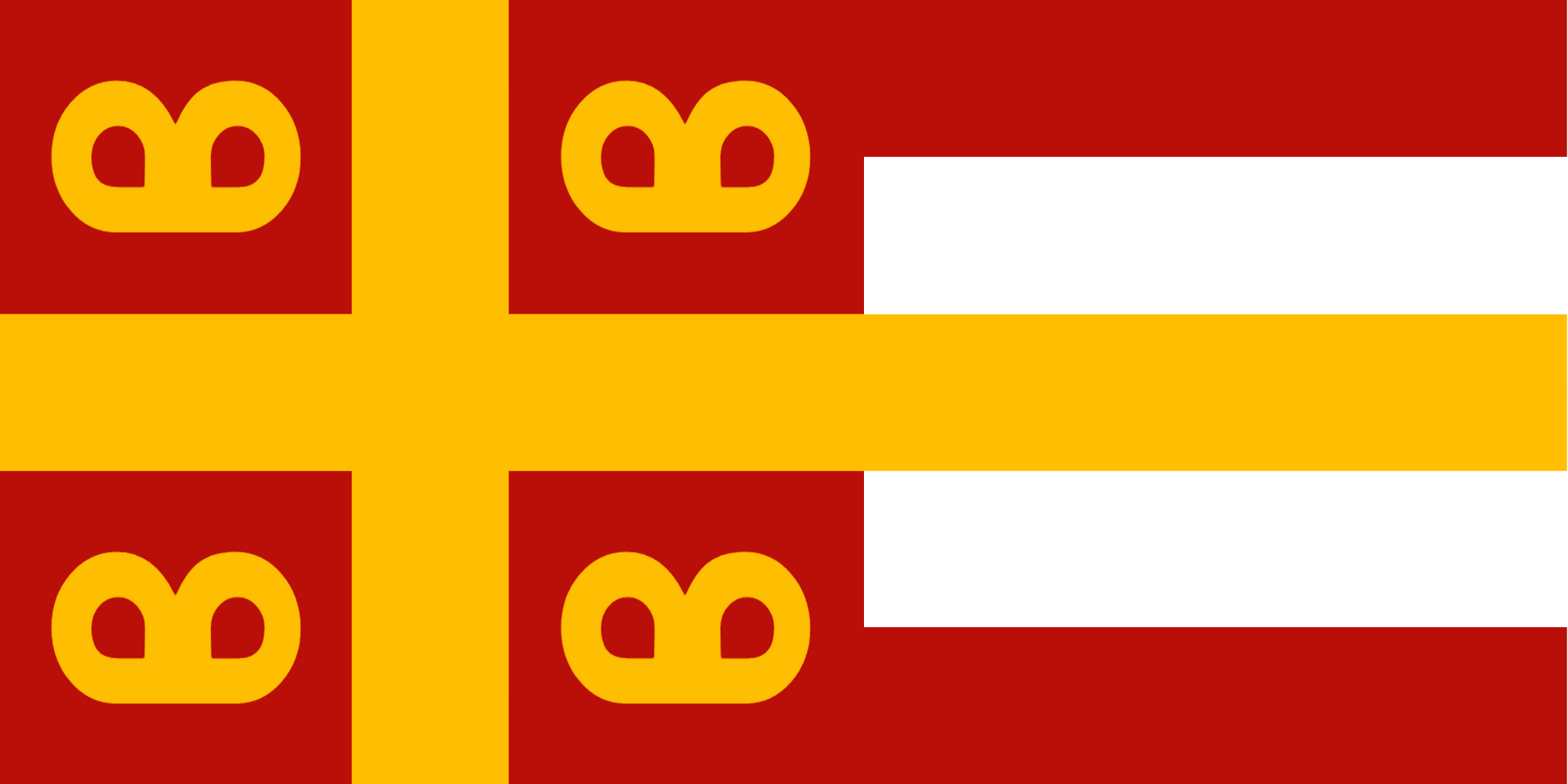
The Byzantine imperial ensign of the 14th century according to Pietro Vesconte's portolan chart.

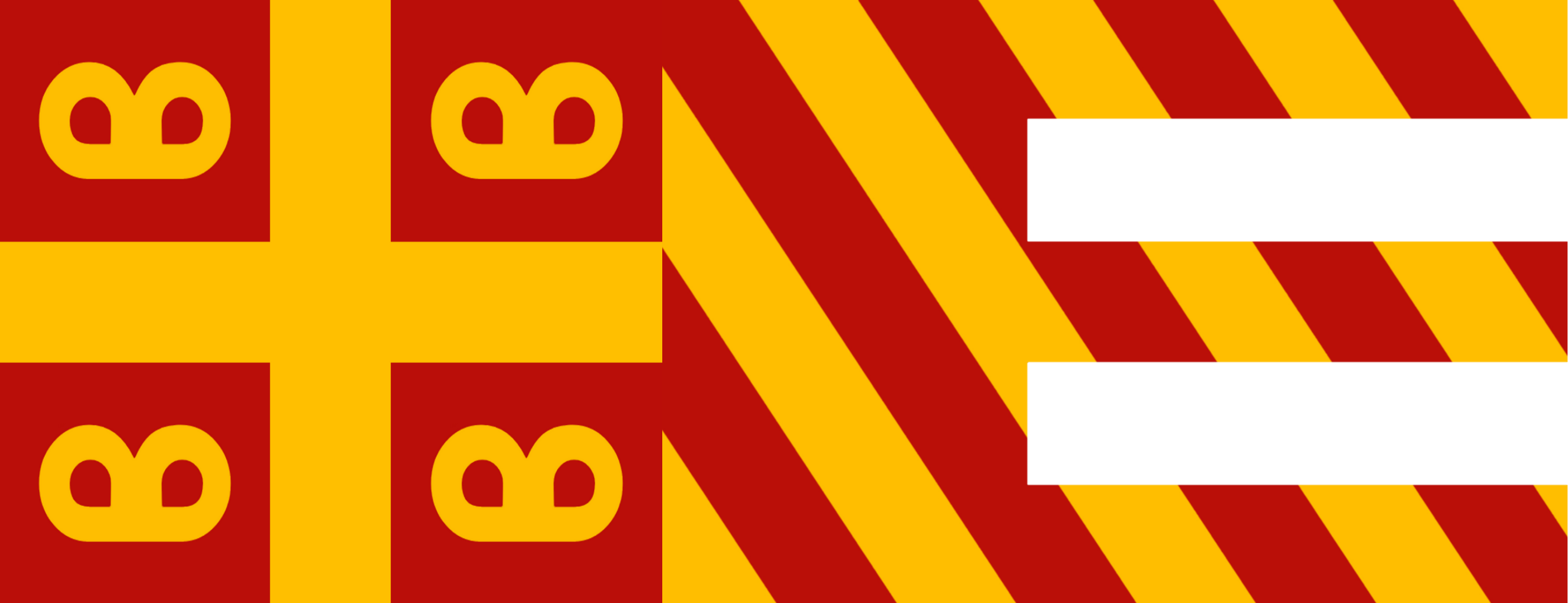
The flag of Salonica according to Pietro Vesconte's portolan chart.

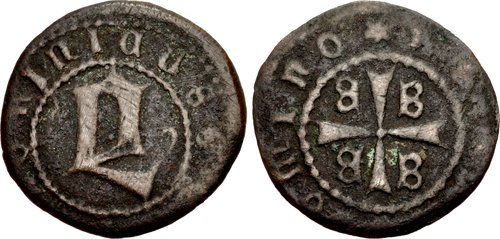
Bronze denaro of Domenico Gattilusio, lord of Lesbos in 1455–1458, with a large "D" on the obverse, and the tetragrammatic cross on the reverse

Arms of William IX Palaiologos, Marquess of Montferrat in 1494–1518

Arms of the House of Gonzaga as Dukes of Mantua

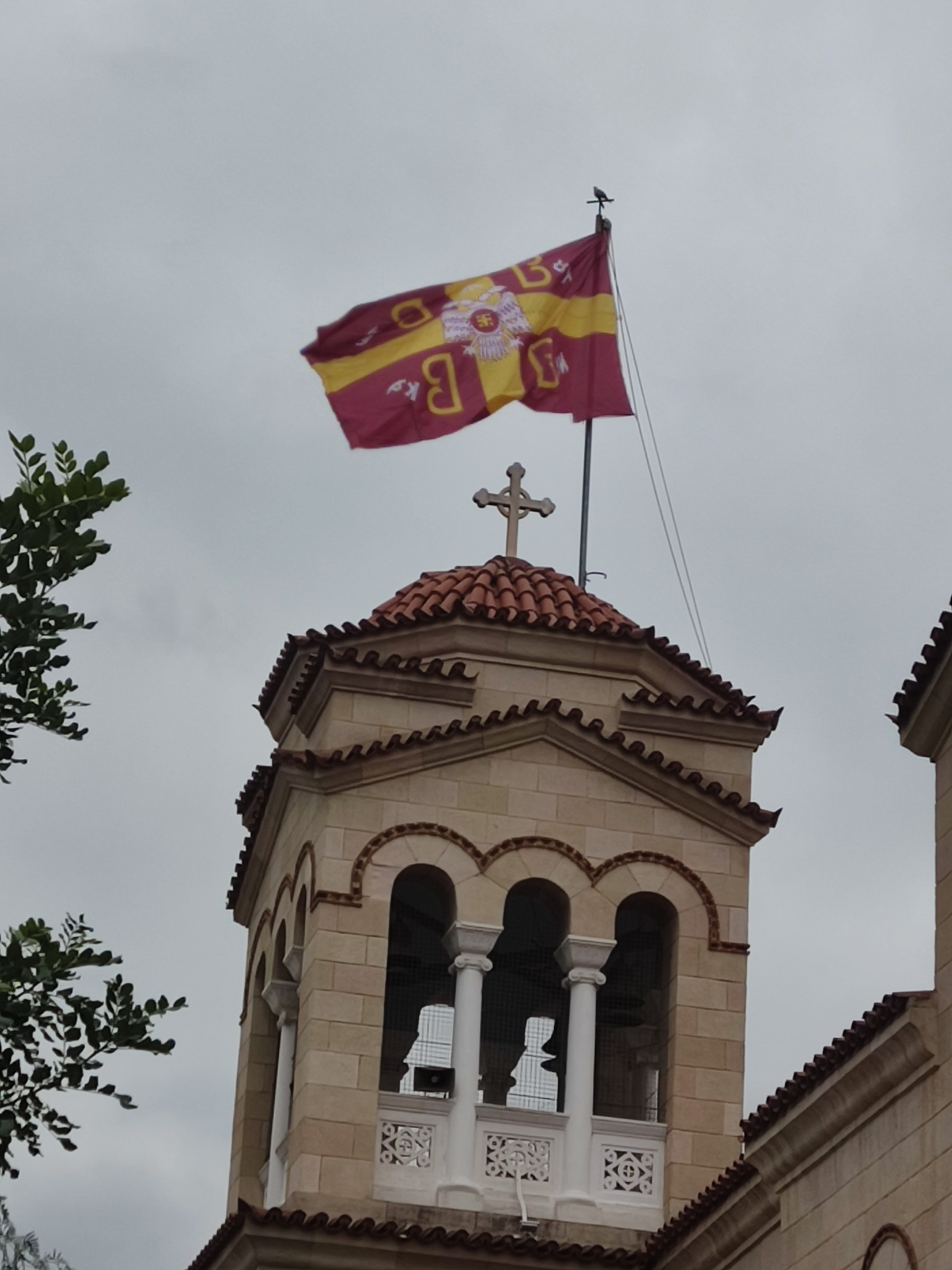
In modern Greece ahistorical variants of the Byzantine flag are hoisted sometimes in churches.

== Personal and family insignia ==
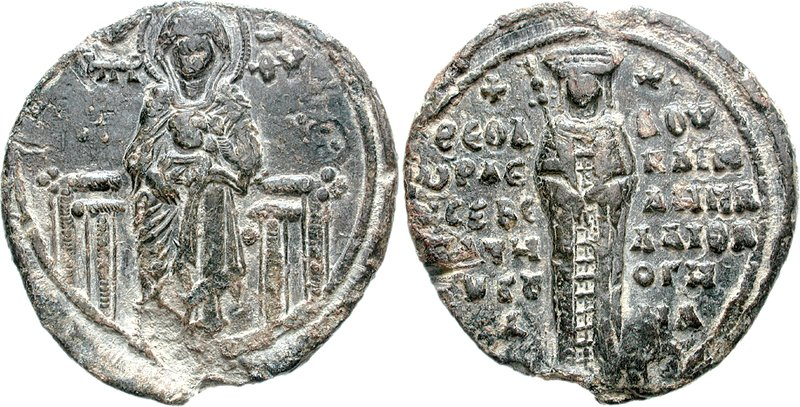
Typical Byzantine seal of Theodora Palaiologina, wife of David VI of Georgia. The Virgin Mary stands on the obverse and a representation of Theodora with her titles on the reverse.

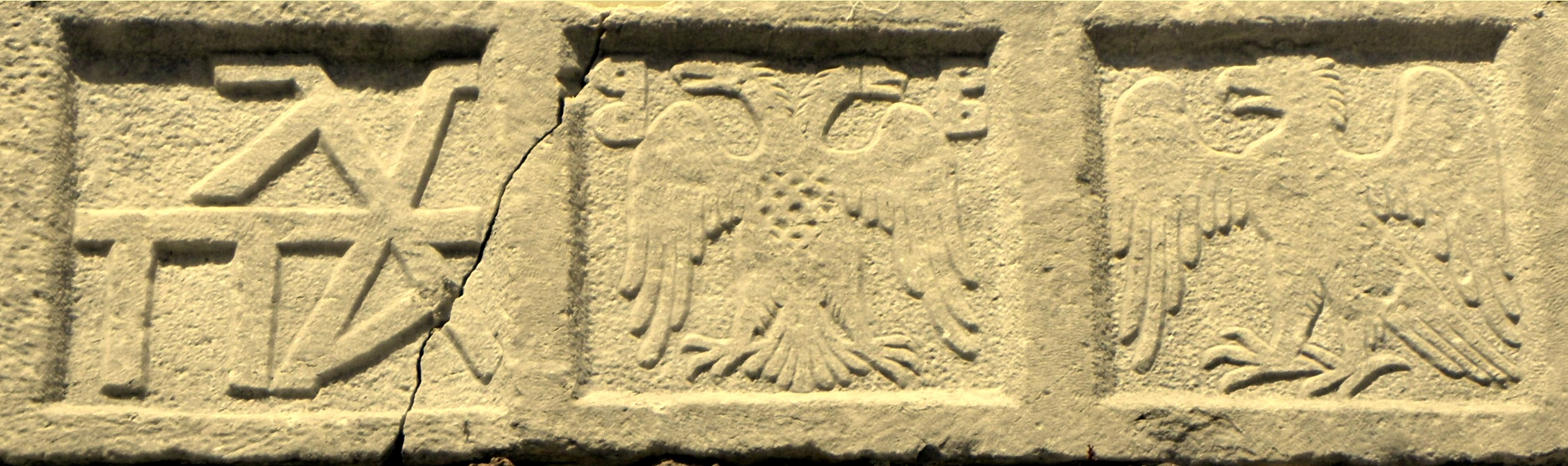
Relief at the Castle of Mytilene, showing the family cypher of the Palaiologoi (left), the Byzantine double-headed eagle (centre) with the Gattilusi coat of arms on its breast, and the eagle of the Doria family (right)

Unlike the western European feudal lords, Byzantine aristocratic families did not, as far as is known, use specific symbols to designate themselves and their followers. (Note: For a survey of the evidence available at the time, cf. Tipaldos 1926, pp. 206–222.) Only from the 12th century onwards, when the Empire came in increased contact with western Europeans because of the Crusades, did heraldry begin to be used among Byzantines. Even then however, the thematology was largely derived from the symbols employed in earlier ages, and its use was limited to the major families of the Empire. Far more common, both in seals and in decorations, was the use of cyphers or monograms (sing. συμπίλημα, sympilēma), with the letters of the owner's personal or family name arranged around a cross.

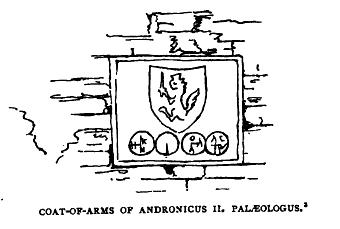
Arms of Andronikos II Palaiologos, located in the now demolished sea walls of Constantinople, sketched by Mary Adelaide Walker in the 19th century.

Another very west-European design could be found on one of the now-demolished towers of the seaward walls of Constantinople, which had been restored by Andronikos II Palaiologos (r. 1282–1328) and bore that emperor's emblem, a crowned lion rampant holding a sword.

The frequent use of the star and crescent moon symbol, which appears on coins, military insignia and, perhaps, as a sometime municipal emblem of the imperial city, appears to be connected to the cult of Hecate Lampadephoros ("light-bearer") in Hellenistic-era Byzantium. In AD 330, Constantine the Great used this symbol while re-dedicating Constantinople to the Virgin Mary.

It is known that Anna Notaras, daughter of the last megas doux of the Byzantine Empire Loukas Notaras, after the fall of Constantinople and her emigration to Italy, made a seal with her coat of arms which included two lions facing each other, each holding a sword on the right paw, and a crescent with the left. However, this most likely represents a design that was created after her emigration to Italy. On the other hand, the adaptation of Byzantine forms to Western uses can be seen with the seal of Andreas Palaiologos, which includes the imperial double-headed eagle on an escutcheon, a practice never used in Byzantium.

== Military flags and insignia ==
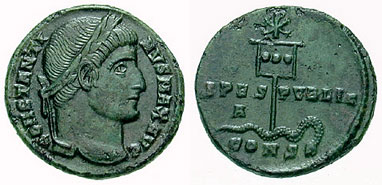
A coin of Constantine (c.337) depicting his labarum spearing a serpent.

The Late Roman army in the late 3rd century continued to use the insignia usual to the Roman legions: the eagle-tipped aquila, the square vexillum, and the imago (the bust of the emperor on a pole). In addition, the use of the draco, adopted from the Dacians, was widespread among cavalry and auxiliary units. Few of them seem to have survived beyond the 4th century, however. The aquila fell out of use with the breaking up of the old legions, the imago was abandoned with the adoption of Christianity, and only the vexillum and the draco are still occasionally attested in the 5th century and beyond. Constantine the Great (r. 306–337) inserted the Chi-Rho emblem in Roman military standards, resulting in the so-called labarum. In iconographical evidence, this commonly takes the form of the Chi-Rho embroidered on the field of a vexillum, but literary evidence suggests also its use as a symbol at the head of a staff. The labarum, although common in the 4th and 5th centuries, vanishes entirely in the 6th, and reappears only much later in altered form as part of the imperial regalia.

In the late 6th-century Stratēgikon attributed to Emperor Maurice, two kinds of military flags appear: the triangular pennon or phlamoulon (φλάμουλον, from Latin: flammula, "little flame"), and the larger bandon (βάνδον, from Latin and ultimately Germanic bandum). The pennons were used for decorative purposes on lances, but the Stratēgikon recommends removing them before battle. According to literary evidence, they were single or double-tailed, while later manuscript illuminations evidence triple-tailed phlamoula. The bandon was the main Byzantine battle standard from the 6th century on, and came even to give its name to the basic Byzantine army unit (bandon or tagma). Its origin and evolution are unknown. It may have resulted from modifications to the draco or the vexillum, but it appears in its final form in the Stratēgikon, composed of a square or rectangular field with streamers attached.

Illuminated chronicles, such as the Madrid Skylitzes, often depict flags conforming to the general bandon type in various colours and designs, but their accuracy is doubtful. While they may give a good general idea of how flags looked like, the flags themselves are "simplified and schematised", and the illustrators do not bother to differentiate between the flags shown for the Byzantines and for their enemies; even the Saracens are shown as flying a flag topped with a cross. The historian A. Babuin furthermore notes that the flags shown in the manuscript vary widely in appearance and that no singular pattern can be discerned, apart from a relatively restricted range of colours (red, white, and blue) used either monochromatically or in alternating bands. In addition, the "considerable length of the streamers" shown in the manuscript does not appear in similar sources from areas under direct Byzantine control, but reflects iconography common in southern Italy, where the manuscript was illuminated.

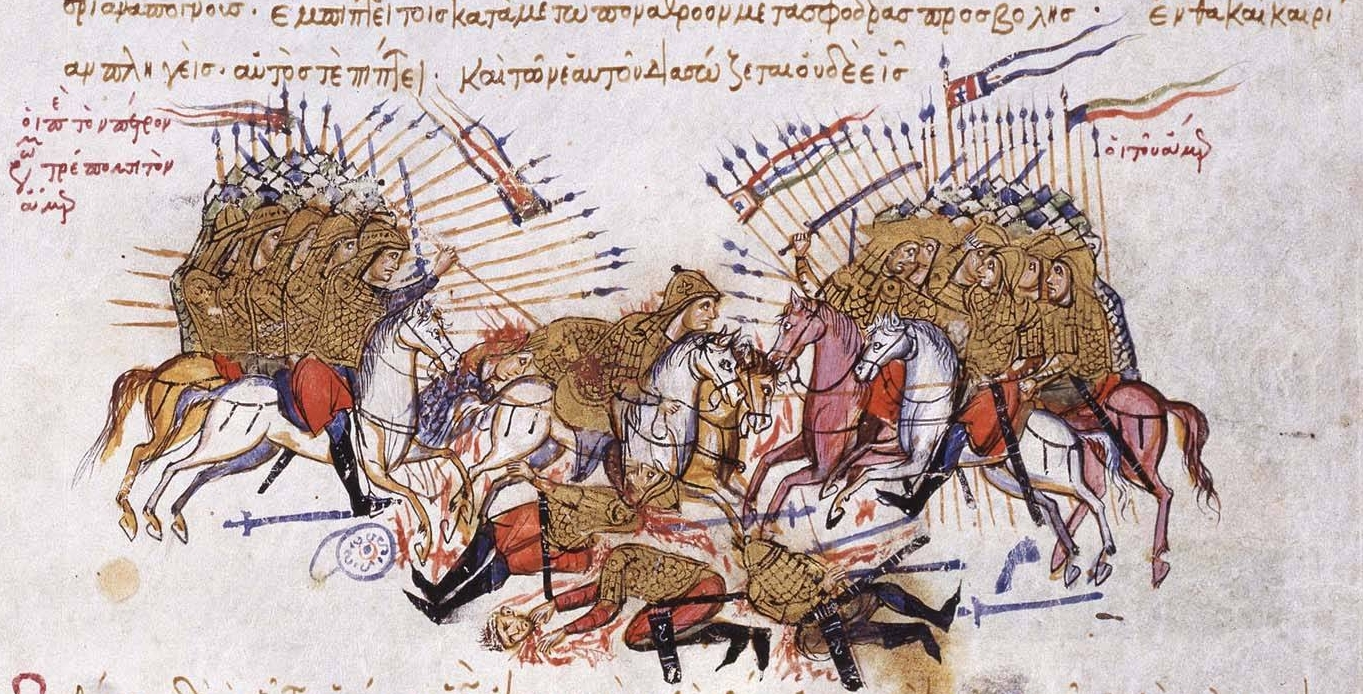
Scene of a battle from the 13th-century Madrid Skylitzes

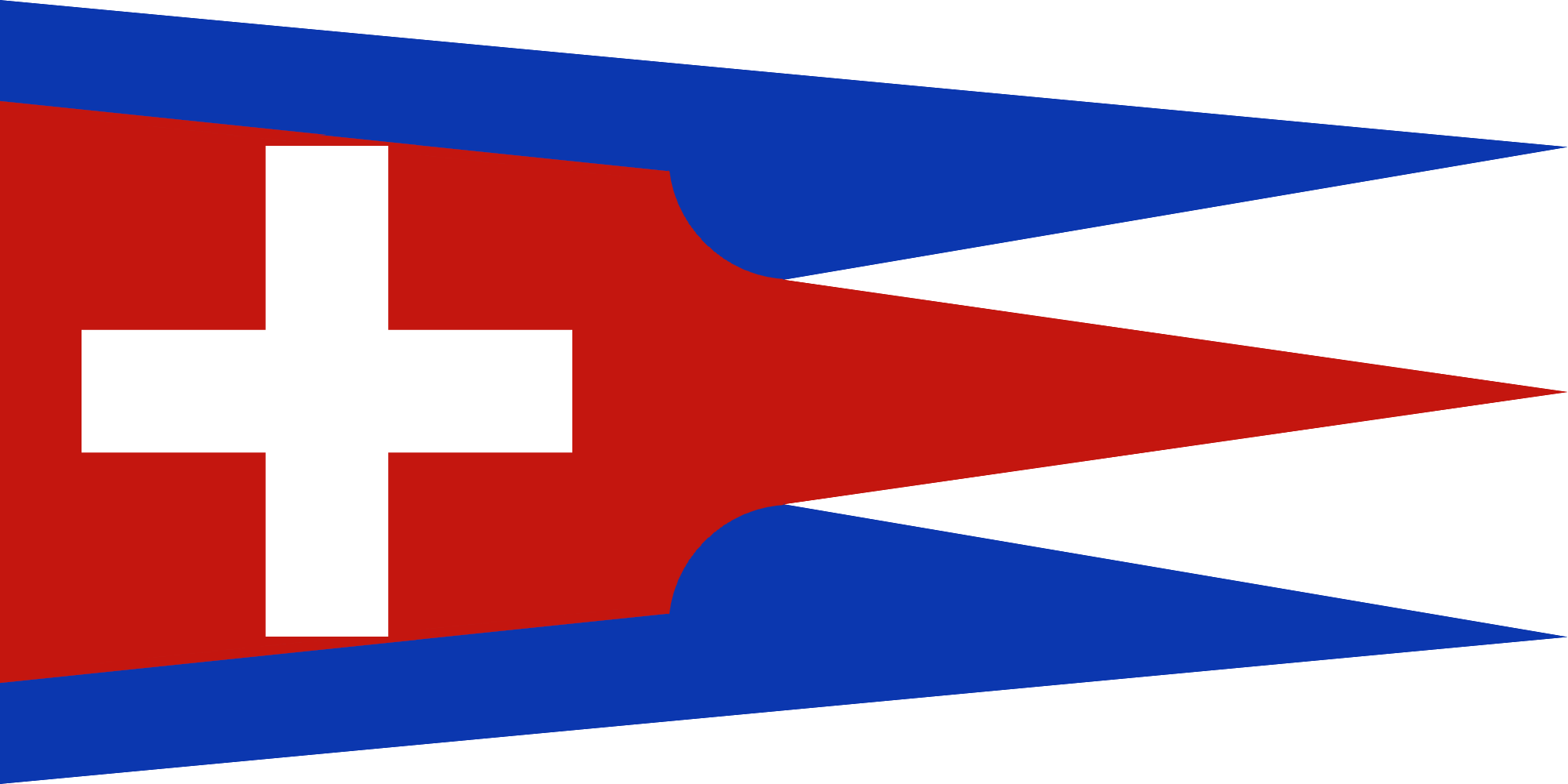
Example of a military banner appearing in the Madrid Skylitzes

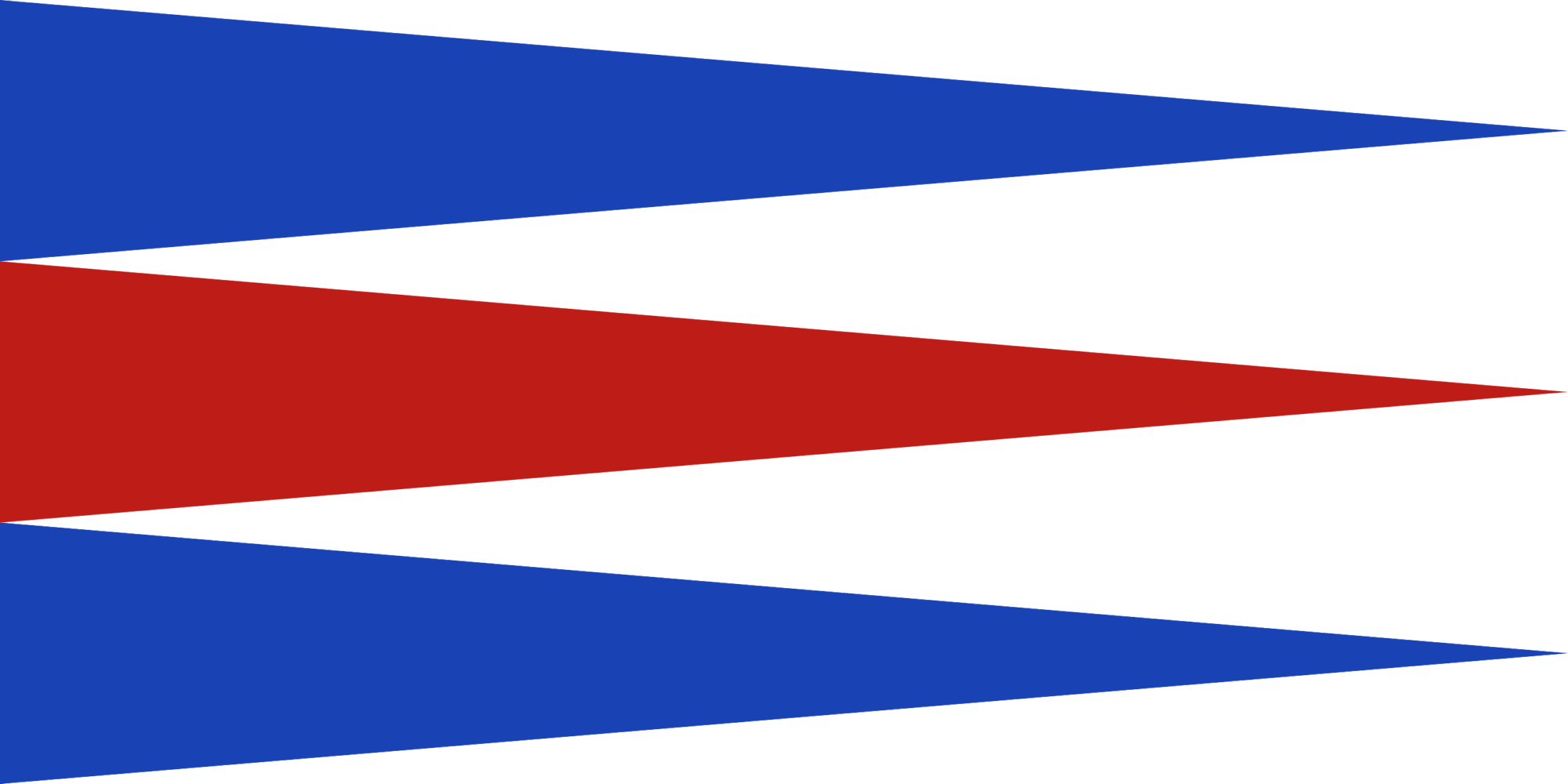
Example of a military banner appearing in the Madrid Skylitzes

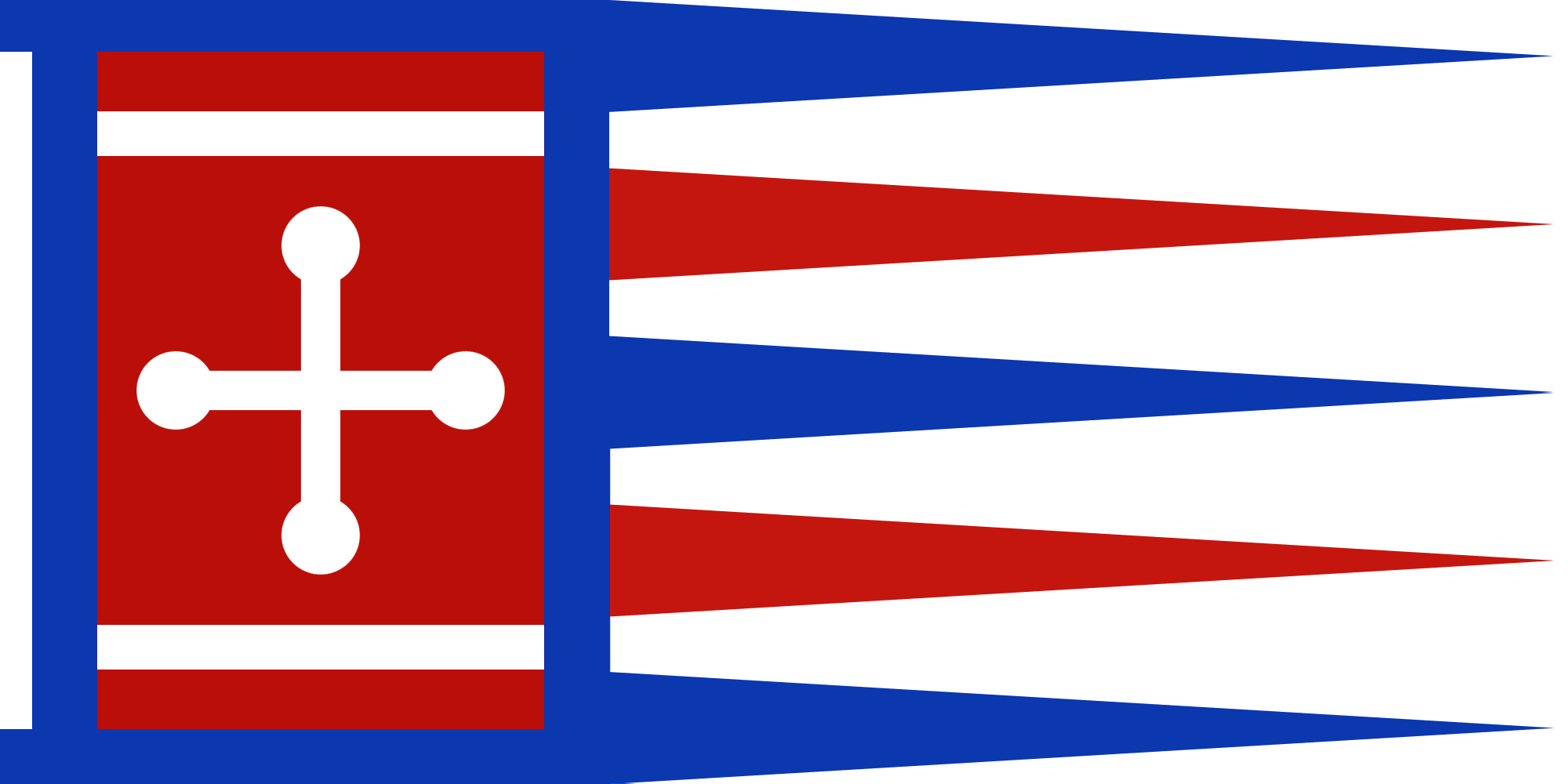
Example of a military banner appearing in the Madrid Skylitzes

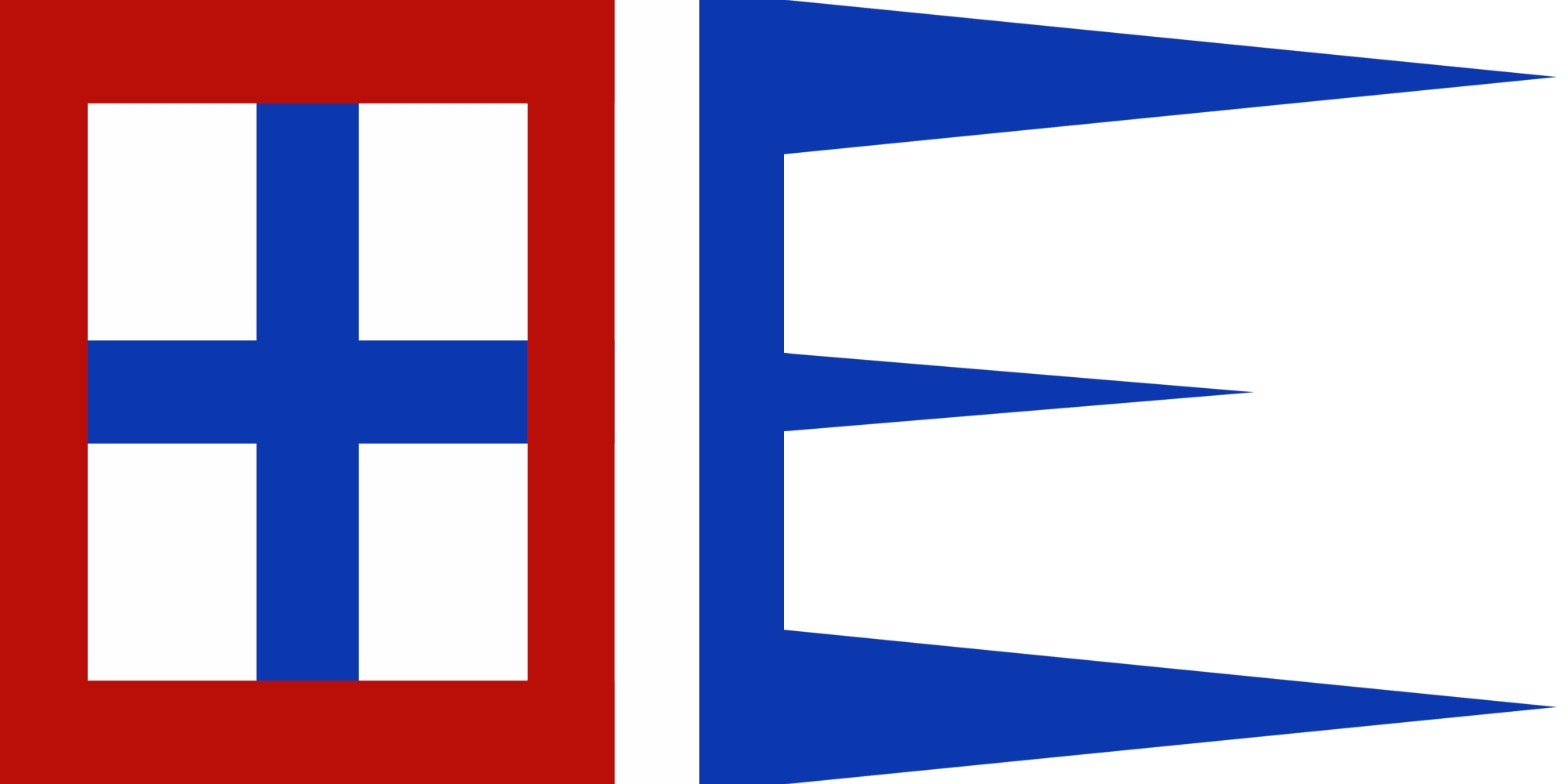
Example of a military banner appearing in the Madrid Skylitzes

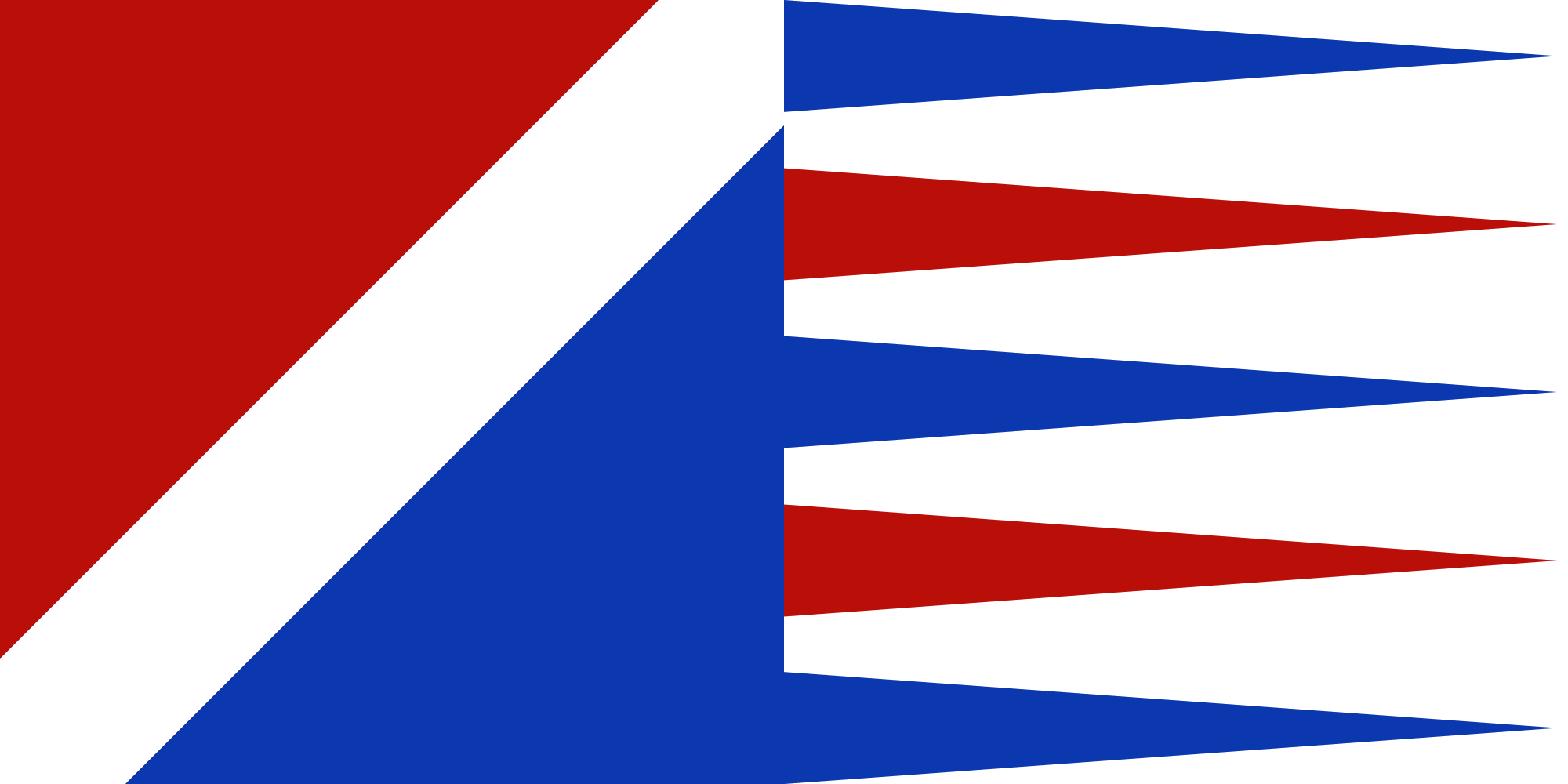
Example of a military banner appearing in the Madrid Skylitzes

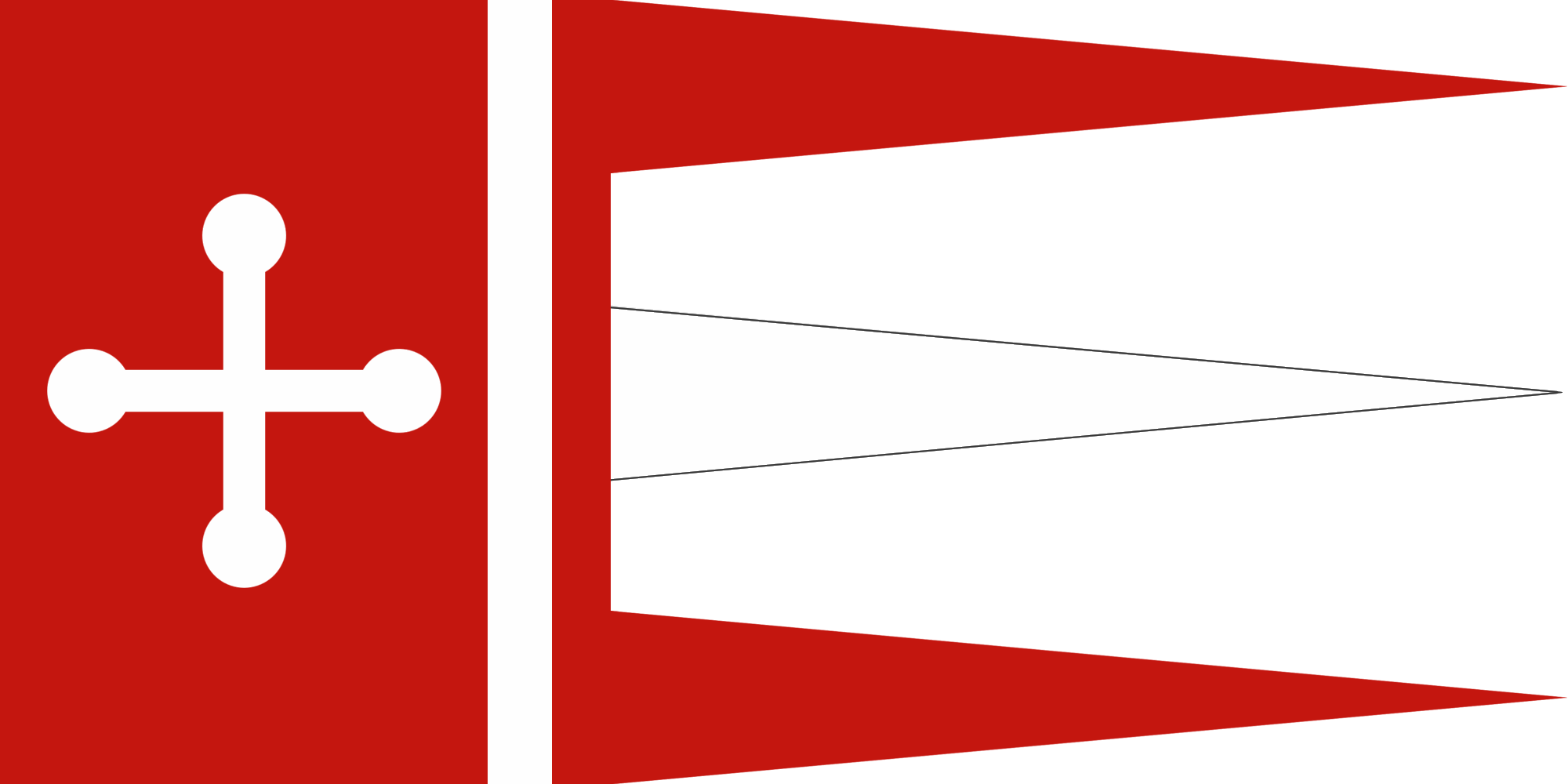
Example of a military banner appearing in the Madrid Skylitzes

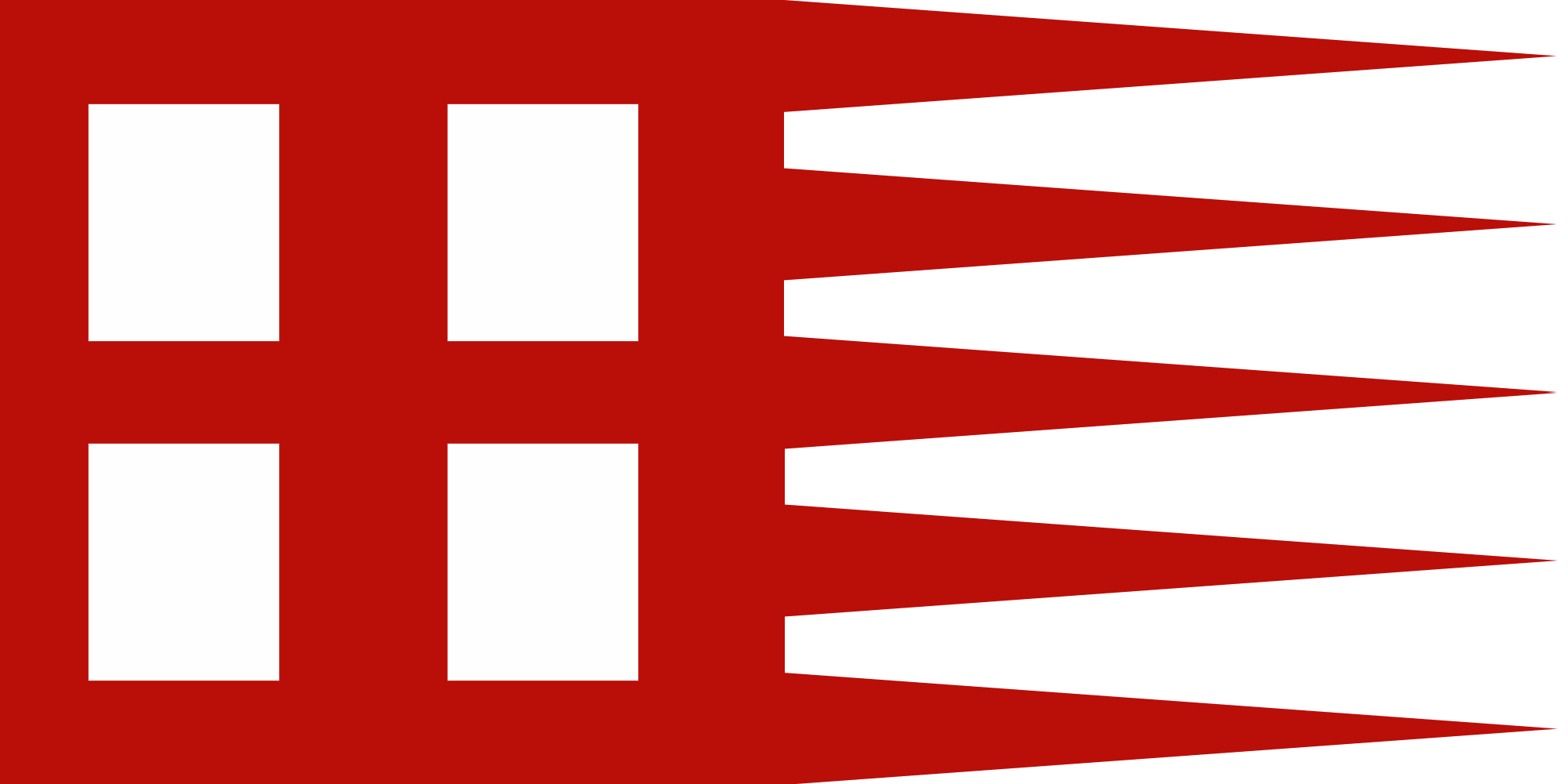
Example of a military banner appearing in the Madrid Skylitzes

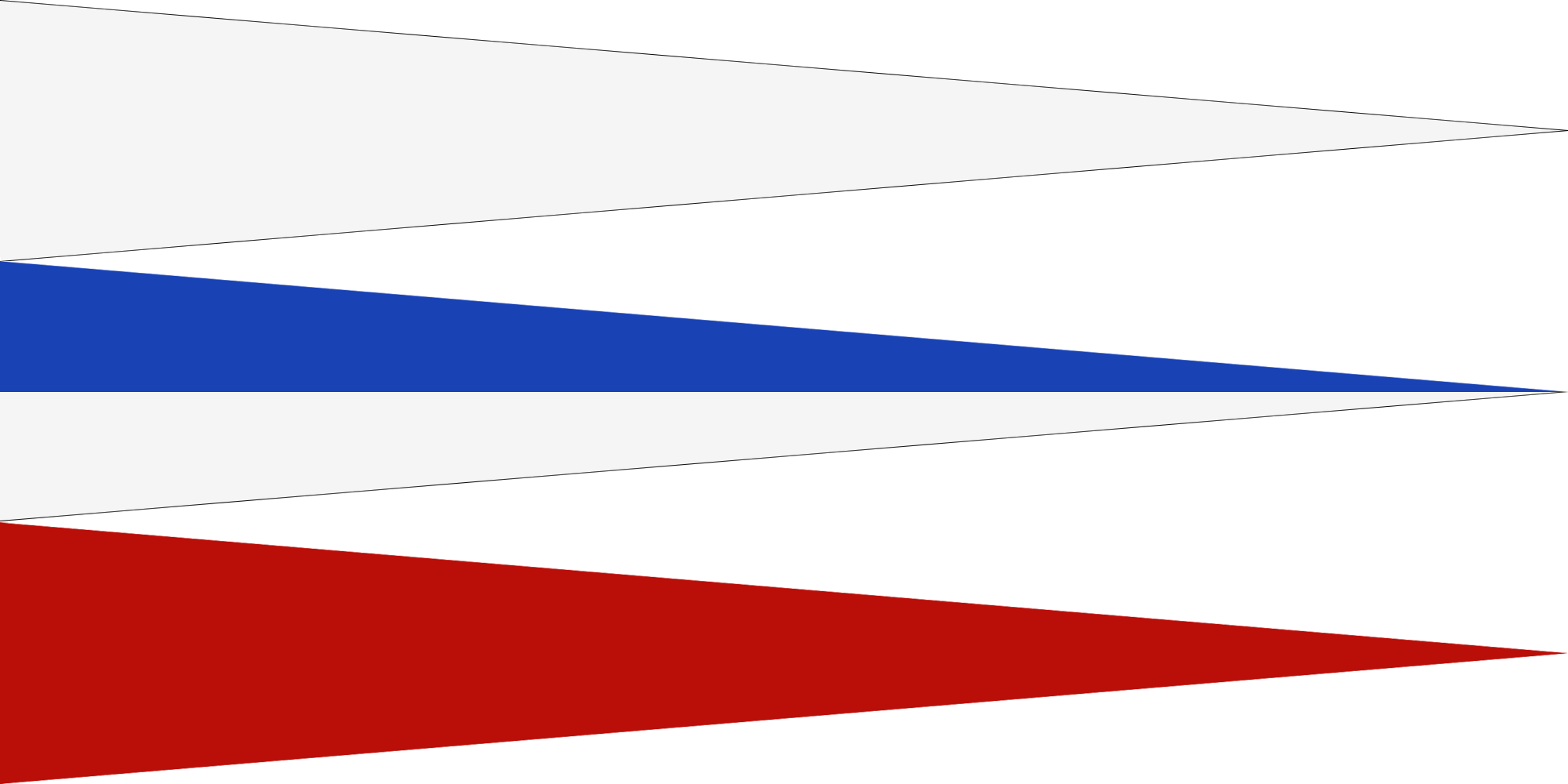
Example of a military banner appearing in the Madrid Skylitzes

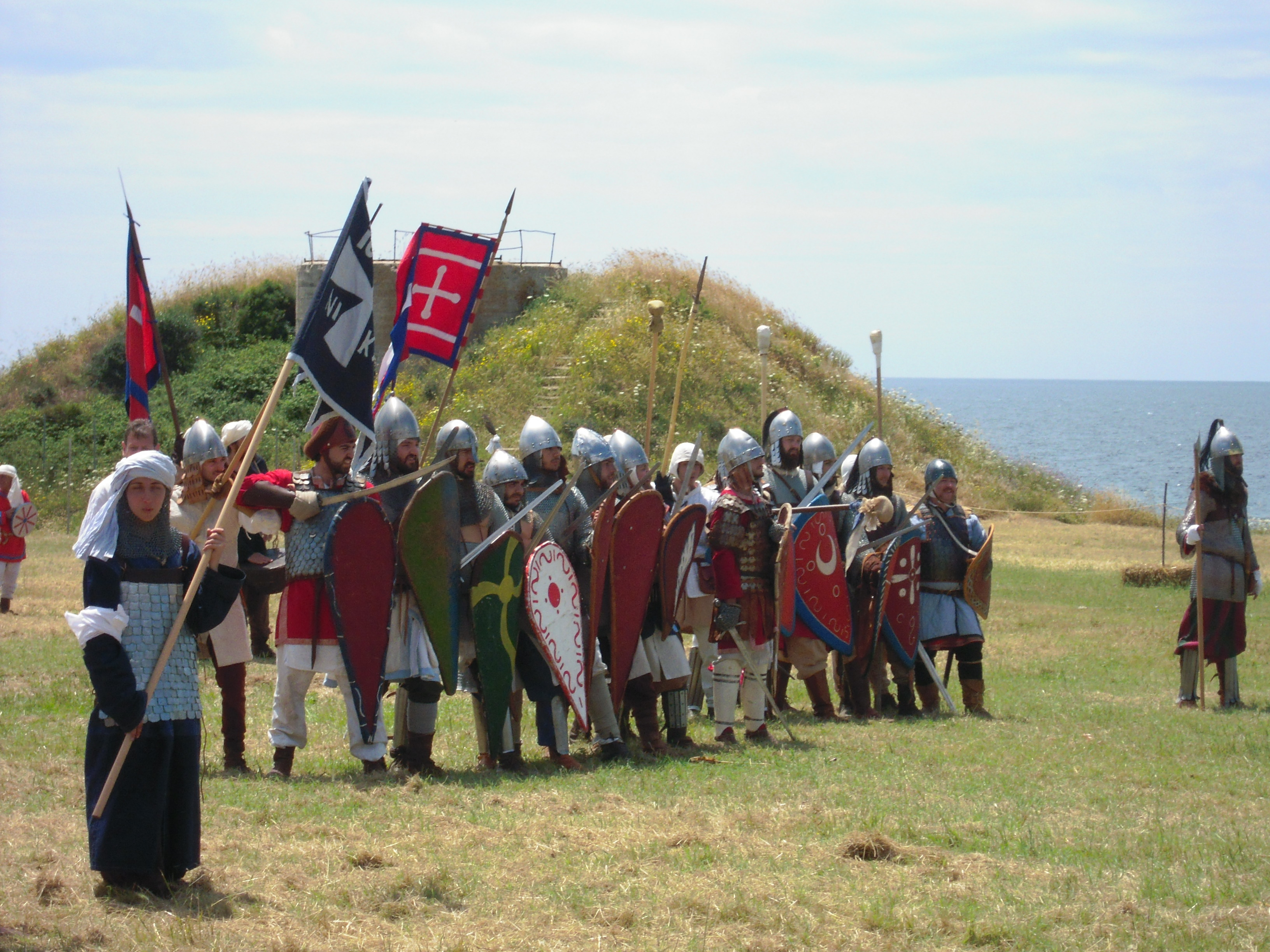
Historical re-enactors of Byzantine soldiers, with flags inspired by the Madrid Skylitzes

According to the Stratēgikon, the colours of the standard reflected a unit's hierarchical subordination: the banda of the regiments of the same brigade (moira, droungos) had a field of the same colour, distinguished by a distinctive device, and the regiments of the same division (meros or tourma) of the army had the same colour on their streamers. Each moira and meros also had their own flag, as well as the army's commanding general (stratēgos). These were on the same pattern but of larger size, and possibly with more streamers (the Stratēgikon depicts flags with two to eight streamers). Maurice further recommends that the flag of the centre meros, led by the deputy commander (hypostratēgos), should be more conspicuous than those of the other merē, and that the flag of the commanding general (or the emperor, if he was present) should be the most conspicuous of all. In addition, the Stratēgikon prescribes a separate standard for the baggage train (touldon) of each moira. The standards were not only used for distinguishing units, but also as rallying points and for conveying signals to the other formations. In the Byzantine navy, likewise, each ship had its own standard. As with their land counterparts, they were also used to convey signals. In the 10th century, the cross became a more prominent symbol, and was often used as a finial instead of a spear point. Under Nikephoros II Phokas (r. 963–969) large crosses of gold and jewels were used as standards, perhaps carried on a pole or otherwise displayed on the flags. In addition, the use of pieces of the True Cross is often mentioned in military parades.

In the late Byzantine period, pseudo-Kodinos records the use of the Palaiologan "tetragrammatic cross" (see above) on the imperial ensign (Greek: βασιλικόν φλάμουλον, basilikon phlamoulon) borne by Byzantine naval vessels, while the navy's commander, the megas doux, displayed an image of the emperor on horseback.

== Ceremonial insignia ==
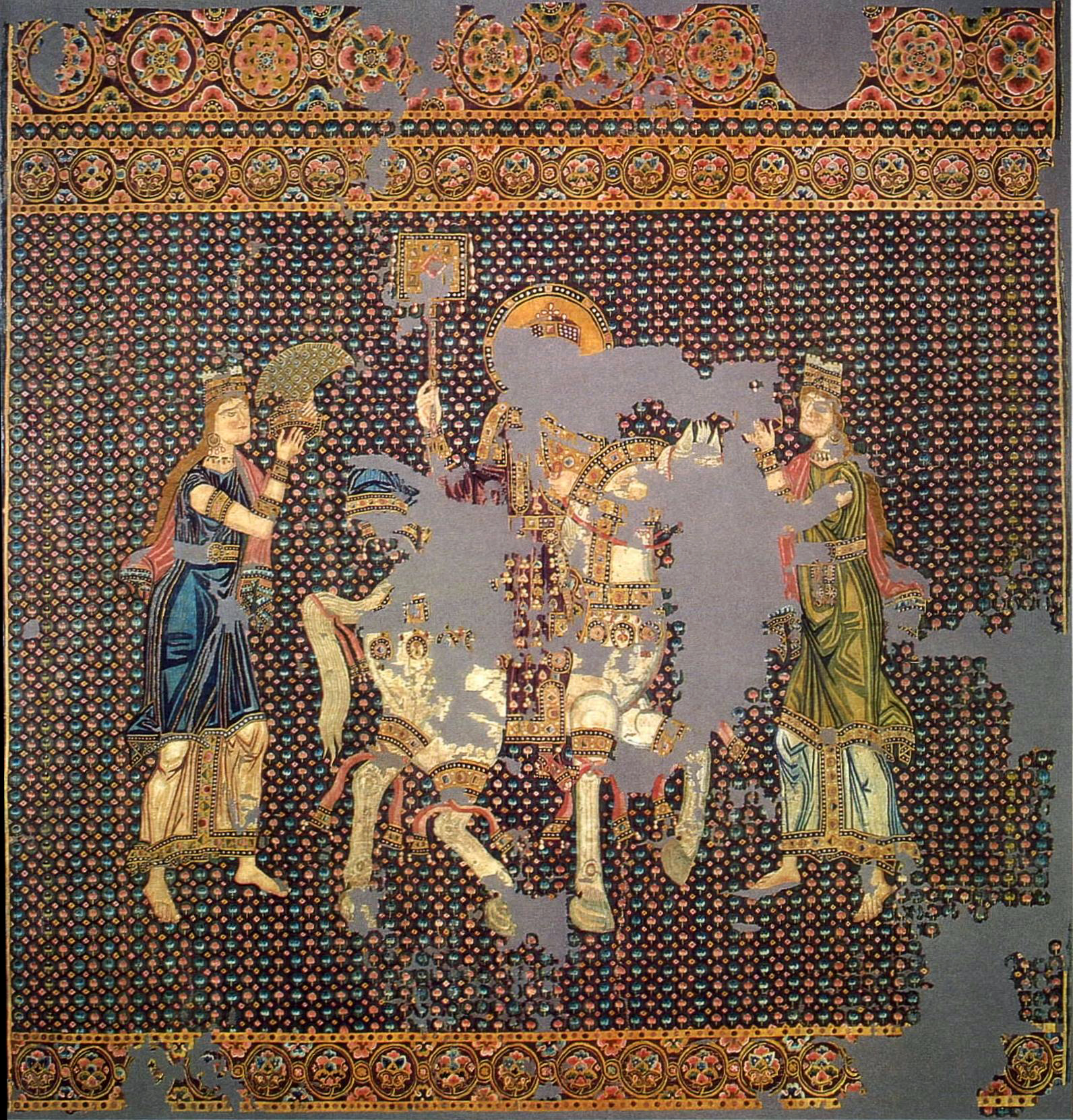
A ceremonial miniature labarum, as it appears borne by a triumphant emperor in the 10th-century Gunthertuch

From the 6th century until the end of the empire, the Byzantines also used a number of other insignia. They are mostly recorded in ceremonial processions, most notably in the 10th-century De Ceremoniis, but they may have been carried in battle as well. When not used, they were kept in various churches throughout Constantinople. Among them were the imperial phlamoula of gold and gold-embroidered silk, and the insignia collectively known as "sceptres" (σκῆπτρα, skēptra), which were usually symbolical objects on top of a staff. A number of them, the so-called "Roman sceptres" (ῥωμαϊκὰ σκῆπτρα, rhōmaïka skēptra) resembled to old vexilla, featuring a hanging cloth (βῆλον, vēlon, from Latin velum). Further insignia of this type included the eutychia or ptychia (εὐτυχία or πτυχία), which probably bore some representation of Victory.

A further group, collectively known as skeuē (σκεύη), is mentioned in the De Ceremoniis, mostly old military standards handed down through the ages. They were the laboura (λάβουρα), probably a form of the labarum; the kampēdiktouria (καμπηδικτούρια), descendants of the batons of the late Roman drill-masters or campiductores; the signa (σίγνα, "insignia"); the drakontia (δρακόντια) and the banda. The drakontia are clearly the descendants of the old Roman draco, and the term draconarius for a standard bearer survived into the 10th century. It is not certain, however, what the later standards looked like. According to the description of Niketas Choniates, they still included the windsock that was the draco′s distinctive feature, but this may be a deliberate archaicism. At any rate, the use of the dragon as an image is attested well into the 14th century.

Pseudo-Kodinos also enumerates various banners and insignia used in imperial processions: one named archistratēgos (ἀρχιστράτηγος, "chief general"); another with images of renowned prelates and eight streamers known as oktapodion (ὀκταπόδιον, "octopus"); another in the form of a cross with the images of St. Demetrius, St. Procopius, St. Theodore Tiro and St. Theodore Stratelates; another depicting St. George on horseback; another in the shape of a dragon (δρακόνειον, drakoneion); and another with the emperor on horseback. A pair of each existed, and were carried in processions, while on campaign, one or two copies were taken along, depending on the size of the imperial escort. These were always preceded by the skouterios bearing the dibellion (διβέλλιον), the emperor's personal ensign, along with the imperial shield (skouterion), and were followed by the banners of the Despots and other commanders, with the banners of the dēmarchoi (the heads of Constantinople's quarters) bringing up the rear. The dibellion's nature has been debated, but its name – most likely a mixed Greek-Latin compound meaning "double velum" – apparently describes a forked pennon, evidently of Western European origin.

== See also ==
- Chi Rho
- Christogram
- Double-headed eagle

== Sources ==
- Androudis, Pascal (2017). "Présence de l'aigle bicéphale en Trebizonde et dans la principauté grecque de Théodoro en Crimée (XIVe-XVe siècles)" (PDF). Byzantiaka (in French). 34: 179–218. ISSN 1012-0513.
- Babuin, A. (2001). "Standards and insignia of Byzantium". Byzantion: Revue internationale des études byzantines. 71 (1): 5–59.
- Bees, Nikos A. (1912). "Zum Thema der Darstellung des zweiköpfigen Adlers bei den Byzantinern". Repertorium für Kunstwissenschaft (in German). XXXV: 321–330.
- Cernovodeanu, Dan (1982). "Contributions à l'Étude de l'héraldique byzantine et post-byzantine". Jahrbuch der Österreichischen Byzantinik. 32 (2): 409–422.
- Crouch, David (2003). "The Historian, Lineage and Heraldry 1050-1250". In Coss, Peter R.; Keen, Maurice Hugh (eds.). Heraldry, Pageantry and Social Display in Medieval England. Woodbridge, Suffolk: Boydell Press. ISBN 9781843830368.
- Dennis, George T. (1981). "Byzantine Battle Flags". Byzantinische Forschungen. 8: 51–60.
- Fourlas, A. (1980). "Adler und Doppeladler. Materialien zum "Adler in Byzanz". Mit einem bibliographischen Anhang zur Adlerforschung". Philoxenia: Prof. Dr. Bernhard Kötting gewidmet von seinen griechischen Schülern (in German). Münster: Aschendorff. pp. 97–120. ISBN 9783402036518.
- Gerola, G. (1934). "L'aquila bizantina e l'aquila imperiale a due teste". Felix Ravenna (in Italian). 43: 7–36.
- Grierson, Philip (1999). Catalogue of the Byzantine Coins in the Dumbarton Oaks Collection and in the Whittemore Collection, Volume 5 Part 1: Michael VIII to Constantine XI, 1258–1453. Introduction, Appendices, and Bibliography. Washington, DC: Dumbarton Oaks. ISBN 978-0-88402-261-9.
- Grosse, Robert (1924). "Die Fahnen in der römisch-byzantinischen Armee des 4.-10. Jahrhunderts". Byzantinische Zeitschrift (in German). 24 (2): 359–372. doi:10.1515/byzs.1924.24.2.359.
- Hendy, Michael F. (1992). Byzantine coins in the Dumbarton Oaks Collection and in the Whittemore Collection, Volume 4, Parts 1-2. Washington, DC: Dumbarton Oaks. ISBN 978-0-88402-233-6.
- Haldon, John (1990). Constantine Porphyrogenitus. Three treatises on imperial military expeditions. Vienna: Verlag der Österreichischen Akademie der Wissenschaften.
- Holmes, William Gordon (2003). The Age of Justinian and Theodora.
- Kazhdan, Alexander, ed. (1991). The Oxford Dictionary of Byzantium. Oxford and New York: Oxford University Press. ISBN 0-19-504652-8.
- Limberis, Vasiliki (1994). Divine Heiress. Routledge.
- Macrides, Ruth J.; Munitiz, Joseph A.; Angelov, Dimiter (2013). Pseudo-Kodinos and the Constantinopolitan Court: Offices and Ceremonies. Farnham, Surrey: Ashgate. ISBN 978-0-7546-6752-0.
- Martins, António (17 December 2007). "Other Byzantine flags shown in the "Book of All Kingdoms" (14th century)". Flags of the World.
- Osswald, Brendan (2018). "Les armoiries des Tocco de Céphalonie dans la citadelle intérieure de la forteresse d'Arta". Bulletin de correspondance hellénique (in French). 142 (2): 803–844. doi:10.4000/bch.689.
- Popović, Bojan (2009). "Imperial Usage of Zoomorphic Motifs on Textiles: the Two-Headed Eagle and the Lion in Circles and Between Crosses in the Late Byzantine Period". Ikon. 2: 127–136. doi:10.1484/J.IKON.3.36. ISSN 1846-8551.
- Soloviev, A. V. (1935). "Les emblèmes héraldiques de Byzance et les Slaves". Seminarium Kondakovianum (in French). 7: 119–164.
- Tipaldos, G. E. (1926). "Εἶχον οἱ Βυζαντινοί οἰκόσημα". Ἐπετηρίς Ἐταιρείας Βυζαντινῶν Σπουδῶν (in Greek). III: 206–222. hdl:11615/16885.
- Tsamakda, Vasiliki (2002). The Illustrated Chronicle of Ioannes Skylitzes in Madrid. Leiden: Alexandros. ISBN 978-9-0806-4762-6.
- van Millingen, Alexander (1899). Byzantine Constantinople: The Walls of the City and Adjoining Historical Sites. London: John Murray Ed.
- Verpeaux, Jean, ed. (1966). Pseudo-Kodinos, Traité des Offices (in French). Centre National de la Recherche Scientifique.
- von Koehne, Bernhard (1871–1873). "Vom Doppeladler". Berliner Blätter für Münz-, Siegel- und Wappenkunde (in German). 6: 1–26.
