= John Vatatzes (megas stratopedarches) =

Byzantine general (died 1345)

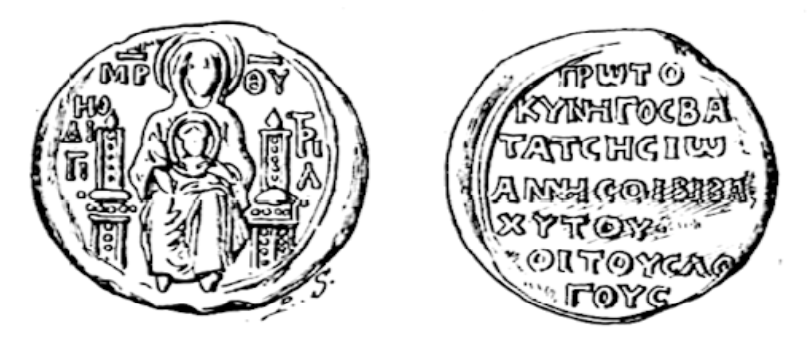
Seal of John Vatatzes as protokynegos

John Vatatzes or Batatzes (Greek: Ἰωάννης Βατάτζης, died 1345) was a Byzantine official and magnate active in the second quarter of the 14th century, playing a prominent role in the Byzantine civil war of 1341–1347.

== Biography ==
Born to a lowly family, Vatatzes had managed to accumulate great riches through his position of apographeus (chief tax official), which he exercised in Thessalonica and eastern Macedonia (Serres, Boleron, Strymon, and Mosynopolis) from 1333 to 1341, as attested in a series of official acts bearing his name. These acts also testify to his bearing the court office of protokynegos (head huntsman). His wealth enabled him to attach his family to some of the leading men in the state: his son married a daughter of Patriarch John XIV Kalekas, and one of his daughters married a son of the megas doux Alexios Apokaukos.

At the outbreak of the civil war in 1341, he initially sided with John VI Kantakouzenos (r. 1347–1354), commanding troops around Didymoteicho, but in early 1342 he switched to the regency under Empress-dowager Anna of Savoy. He was appointed to the post of megas chartoularios in 1342 and appointed briefly governor of Thessalonica in 1343. Despite the familial ties to the leaders of the anti-Kantakouzenos faction, however, in summer 1343, he defected back to Kantakouzenos, surrendering several fortresses to him. In gratitude, Kantakouzenos named him megas stratopedarches.

Soon after, Vatatzes defeated a loyalist army under a certain Aplesphares. One of his daughters married Suleyman, the Emir of Karasi, one of Kantakouzenos's Turkish allies. Following the death of Apokaukos in June 1345, however, he tried to re-approach the regency, by promising to turn the Turks against Kantakouzenos. According to the account provided in Kantakouzenos's own memoirs, Kantakouzenos twice sent envoys bidding him to abandon his treasonous designs, offering him pardon and more honours. Vatatzes refused, crossed into Thrace with a Turkish army, and tried to have them attack the towns held by Kantakouzenos. The Turks refused and killed him at Garella, taking his son and the other Byzantines of Vatatzes's entourage as slaves.

== Sources ==
- de Vries-Van der Velden, Eva (1989). L'élite byzantine devant l'avance turque à l'époque de la guerre civile de 1341 à 1354 (in French). Amsterdam: J.C. Gieben. ISBN 90-5063-026-X.
- Guilland, Rodolphe (1967). Recherches sur les Institutions Byzantines, Tome I (in French). Berlin: Akademie-Verlag.
- Trapp, Erich; Beyer, Hans-Veit; Walther, Rainer; Sturm-Schnabl, Katja; Kislinger, Ewald; Leontiadis, Ioannis; Kaplaneres, Sokrates (1976–1996). Prosopographisches Lexikon der Palaiologenzeit (in German). Vienna: Verlag der Österreichischen Akademie der Wissenschaften. ISBN 3-7001-3003-1.
