= Count of the Stable =

Roman military position

The Count of the Stable (Latin: comes stabuli; Ancient Greek: κόμης τοῦ σταύλου/στάβλου, romanized: komes tou staulou/stablou) was a late Roman and Byzantine office responsible for the horses and pack animals intended for use by the army and the imperial court. From Byzantium, it was adopted by the Franks, and is the origin of the post and title of constable, via the Old French conestable.

== History and functions ==
The post first appears in the 4th century as the tribunus [sacri] stabuli ('tribune of the [sacred] stable'), initially responsible for the levying of horses from the provinces. According to Ammianus Marcellinus, the holders of the post ranked equal to the tribunes of the Scholae Palatinae guard regiments. In the Notitia Dignitatum, they are listed as the praepositi gregum et stabulorum under the comes rerum privatarum. By the early 5th century, as attested in the Codex Theodosianus, they were raised to comites with the rank of vir clarissimus, but the older title of tribune remained in parallel use for some time (cf. Cod. Theod., 6.13.1).

Eight holders of the office are known from the 4th century, including Emperor Valens (r. 364–378) and his brothers-in-law Cerealis and Constantinianus. Evidently, the post was closely associated with the imperial family, as affirmed further when Stilicho was appointed to it on the occasion of his marriage to the adopted niece of Emperor Theodosius I (r. 378–395), Serena. However, holders are rarely mentioned thereafter. The distinguished general Flavius Aetius held the post in 451, and in the 6th century, the variant "Count of the Imperial Grooms" was conferred on leading generals such as Belisarius and Constantinianus, while Baduarius, a relative of Emperor Justin II (r. 565–578), is recorded by the 9th-century chronicler Theophanes the Confessor to have held the post of 'Count of the Imperial Stables'. The office reappears in the sources in the 820s, when the "protospatharios and komes tou basilikou hippostasiou" Damian led an unsuccessful expedition against the Saracens in Crete.

The Byzantine office of the komes tou staulou is best known during the 9th and 10th centuries, when it was classed as belonging to the group of military officials known as stratarchai. Along with the Logothete of the Herds, he was responsible for the imperial horses in the capital, Constantinople, and for the horse ranches in the great army camp (aplekton) at Malagina in Bithynia. He usually held the dignity of patrikios, and ranked 51st in the overall imperial hierarchy. During imperial processions, as well as during campaigns, he escorted the emperor along with the protostrator, and played a role in the receptions of foreign ambassadors.

In the 13th century, the Latin-inspired office of the konostaulos seems to have replaced the komes tou staulou, but another title, the 'Count of the Imperial Horses' (κόμης τῶν βασιλικῶν ἴππων, komes ton basilikon hippon ) appears in the 14th-century treatise on offices of Pseudo-Kodinos. Aside from bringing the emperor his horse and holding it while he mounted it, the functions of this office are unknown. He does not appear to have held a rank within the court hierarchy, but his proximity to the emperor did apparently lead to some influence, as in the case of Constantine Chadenos, who rose from this post to high political offices under Emperor Michael VIII (r. 1259–1282).

== Subordinate officials ==
The staff of the Count of the Stable is not explicitly mentioned in Byzantine sources, but its composition for the 9th and 10th centuries can be inferred, at least in part, from various sources. It included:

- Two chartoularioi, one for Constantinople (ὁ ἔσω χαρτουλάριος, ho eso chartoularios, 'the inner chartoularios') and one for Malagina (ὁ χαρτουλάριος τῶν Μαλαγίνων, ho chartoularios ton Malaginon, or ὁ ἔξω χαρτουλάριος, ho exo chartoularios, 'the outer [i.e., provincial] chartoularios').
- The epeiktes, in seals often epiktes (ἐπ[ε]ίκτης, according to John Bagnell Bury "an overseer who presses work on"), responsible for fodder, watering, and other related supplies like horseshoes or saddles.
- The saphramentarios (σαφραμεντάριος), the origin of whose title and his functions are unknown. In the sources, he seems to be responsible for outfitting the imperial mules prior to an expedition.
- The four counts of Malagina (οἱ δ′ κόμητες τῶν Μαλαγίνων, hoi d' kometes ton Malaginon).
- Forty grooms (οἱ μ′ σύντροφοι τῶν σελλαρίων, hoi m' syntrofoi ton sellarion), also known as the 'grooms of the two stables' (οἱ σύντροφοι τῶν δύο στάβλων, hoi syntrofoi ton dyo stablon, i.e., Constantinople and Malagina). These were probably subaltern officers charged with leading detachments of mules.
- The kellarios (κελλάριος) or apothetes (ἀποθέτης) of the imperial stable, responsible for the stables' granary.

== Sources ==
- Bury, J. B.; Philotheus (1911). The Imperial Administrative System of the Ninth Century (With a Revised Text of the Kletorologion of Philotheos). London: Oxford University Press.
- Guilland, Rodolphe (1967). "Le Grand connétable". Recherches sur les institutions byzantines [Studies on the Byzantine Institutions]. Berliner byzantinische Arbeiten 35 (in French). Vol. I. Berlin and Amsterdam: Akademie-Verlag & Adolf M. Hakkert. pp. 469–477. OCLC 878894516.
- Kazhdan, Alexander, ed. (1991). The Oxford Dictionary of Byzantium. Oxford and New York: Oxford University Press. ISBN 0-19-504652-8.
- Lenski, Noel Emmanuel (2002). Failure of Empire: Valens and the Roman State in the Fourth Century A.D. Berkeley and Los Angeles, California: University of California Press. ISBN 978-0-520-23332-4.
- Oikonomides, Nicolas (1972). Les Listes de Préséance Byzantines des IXe et Xe Siècles (in French). Paris: Editions du Centre National de la Recherche Scientifique.
