= Phile (politician) =

Phile (Ancient Greek: Φίλη) (c. 50 B.C.) was the first recorded female benefactor and the first female magistrate in the ancient Greek city of Priene.

Phile was the daughter of Apollonius and wife of Thessalus, the son of Polydectes.

She was honored in a first-century BC public decree for constructing, at her own expense, the city reservoir and aqueduct. Rives writes that the coincidence of Phile’s benefactions and public office suggests that "the increasing importance of wealth in public life, i.e., the ability to fund important public works, may have played a role in overcoming the traditional ineligibility of women for public office." It is likely that she was made a magistrate because she promised to contribute to the public works out of her own private funds.

Phile was not the first woman in the Ancient Greek world to hold a public office - an inscription records a woman as archon (magistrate) in Histria in the 2nd century BC - but it was nevertheless exceptional and part of the increasing freedom of women in the Greek world during the Hellenistic era, when the documentation shows a greater independence of women in marriage contracts and being allowed to act without a male guardian in economic and public affairs.
