= Logariastes =

Financial officer in the Byzantine Empire who controlled imperial expenses

Logariastes (Greek: λογαριαστής, lit. 'accountant') was a type of financial official in the Byzantine Empire from the early 11th century onwards, with the task of controlling expenses.

The post is attested for the first time in 1012, and existed both within the financial bureaux (sekreta) of the central government such as those of the logothetes tou genikou, the chartoularios tou vestiariou and the sakellarios as well as in the provincial administration, in monasteries or in private estates. Logariastai appear in the sources until the 15th century.

Emperor Alexios I Komnenos (r. 1081–1118) created the post of megas logariastes (μέγας λογαριαστής, 'grand accountant'), first attested in 1094. Initially, it shared the duty of general comptroller of the fisc with the sakellarios, but soon replaced the latter office entirely. The post is attested until the 14th century. In the mid-14th century Book of Offices of pseudo-Kodinos, the megas logariastes is ranked 40th in the palace hierarchy, following the logothetes ton oikeiakon and preceding the protokynegos. According to peudo-Kodinos, by his time he had no function, but was merely an honorific dignity. The costume of office was identical to that of the logothetes ton oikeiakon, i.e. a turban (phakeolis) and the epilourikon, probably a descendant of the middle Byzantine epilorikon, a garment worn over armour.

In the 14th century, the special post of the logariastes tes aules (λογαριαστὴς τῆς αὐλῆς, 'accountant of the court') is attested, responsible for paying the salaries of certain courtiers. A logariastes ton chrysoboullon (λογαριαστὴς τῶν χρυσοβοῦλλων, 'accountant of the chrysobulls') is also recorded, but its duties are unclear.

== Sources ==
- Kazhdan, Alexander (1991). "Logariastes". In Kazhdan, Alexander (ed.). The Oxford Dictionary of Byzantium. Oxford and New York: Oxford University Press. pp. 1244–1245. ISBN 0-19-504652-8.
- Parani, Maria G. (2003). Reconstructing the Reality of Images: Byzantine Material Culture and Religious Iconography (11th to 15th Centuries). Leiden: Brill. ISBN 978-90-04-12462-2.
- Trapp, Erich; Beyer, Hans-Veit; Walther, Rainer; Sturm-Schnabl, Katja; Kislinger, Ewald; Leontiadis, Ioannis; Kaplaneres, Sokrates (1976–1996). Prosopographisches Lexikon der Palaiologenzeit (in German). Vienna: Verlag der Österreichischen Akademie der Wissenschaften. ISBN 3-7001-3003-1.
- Verpeaux, Jean, ed. (1966). Pseudo-Kodinos, Traité des Offices (in French). Paris: Centre National de la Recherche Scientifique.
