= Oikeios =

Byzantine court title

The term oikeios (Greek: οἰκεῖος, "belonging to the household") was used as an honorific designation and eventually as a formal title by the Byzantine Empire in the 9th–15th centuries.

In philosophy, the adjective belongs to the same family of words as the Greek oikeiôsis, in Latin accommodatio, which plays an important role in Stoic doctrine and refers to the appropriation of the living to oneself.

In Byzantium, the term was originally used in the Kletorologion of 899 to designate the close relatives of the reigning Byzantine emperor. According to the Oxford Dictionary of Byzantium, "[it] is probable that the epithet oikeios was linked to the honorific title doulos", meaning "slave" or "servant", in the sense that "a man titled oikeios would call himself the doulos of his majesty".

By the late 12th century, under the Komnenian emperors, the epithet was formalized into a semi-official title awarded to senior dignitaries, mostly civil ones, until the end of the Empire. Indeed, it was sometimes used as a title in itself, rather than being combined with other offices or dignities.

== Sources ==
- Kazhdan, Alexander, ed. (1991). The Oxford Dictionary of Byzantium. Oxford and New York: Oxford University Press. ISBN 0-19-504652-8.
