= Manuel Philes =

Byzantine poet (c. 1275–1345)

- Μανουήλ Φιλής
- Born: c. 1275; Ephesus
- Died: c. 1345
- Citizenship: Byzantine Empire
- Education: Constantinople
- Occupations: Poet, Author

Manuel Philes (Greek: Μανουήλ Φιλής; c. 1275–1345) was a Byzantine poet from Ephesus. He was "the most prolific author of the late Byzantine period".

== Biography ==
At an early age, he moved to Constantinople, where he was the pupil of George Pachymeres, in whose honour he composed a memorial poem. Philes appears to have travelled extensively, and his writings contain much information concerning the imperial court and distinguished Byzantines. He participated in an embassy to the "Tauroscythians" (Tatars) in 1293 to arrange the marriage of Maria, daughter of Andronikos II Palaiologos, to Toqta, the khan of the Golden Horde. He then was on a mission to recruit Georgian archers in 1305 and 1306. Having offended one of the emperors, probably Andronikos II, by indiscreet remarks published in a chronography, he was briefly thrown into prison and only released after an abject apology.

Philes is the counterpart of Theodorus Prodromus in the time of the Komnenoi; his character, as shown in his poems, is that of a begging poet, always pleading poverty, and ready to descend to the grossest flattery to obtain the favorable notice of the great. With one unimportant exception, his productions are in verse, the greater part in dodecasyllabic iambic trimeters, the remainder in the fifteen-syllable "political" measure.

Philes was the author of poems on a great variety of subjects: on the characteristics of animals, chiefly based upon Aelian and Oppian, a didactic poem of some 2000 lines, dedicated to Michael IX Palaiologos; on the elephant; on plants; a necrological poem, probably written on the death of one of the sons of the imperial house; a panegyric on John VI Kantakouzenos, in the form of a dialogue; a conversation between a man and his soul; on ecclesiastical subjects, such as church festivals, Christian beliefs, the saints and fathers of the church; on works of art, perhaps the most valuable of all his pieces for their bearing on Byzantine iconography, since the writer had before him the works he describes, and also the most successful from a literary point of view; occasional poems, many of which are simply begging letters in verse.

Philes also produced a substantial body of verse translations, which comprise about 16% of his approximately 25,000 verses. These include translations of the Psalms, a homily by Basil of Caesarea, a passage from Lucian's Herodotus or Aëtion, a fable, three troparia, and the Akathist Hymn.

His translation of the Akathist consists of 295 Byzantine dodecasyllabic verses, corresponding to the twenty-four stanzas of the hymn together with its six-verse second proem. Its date of composition cannot be determined precisely, but it must have been composed by 1337, the date of the earliest manuscript known to transmit the poem.

== Sources ==
- Zagklas, Nikolaos (2019). "Byzantine Poetry: An Introduction". In Hörandner, Wolfram; Rhoby, Andreas; Zagklas, Nikos (eds.). A Companion to Byzantine Poetry. Leiden: Brill. ISBN 978-90-04-39288-5.
