= Akolouthos =

Byzantine office

Akolouthos (Greek: ἀκόλουθος, lit. 'follower, attendant') was a Byzantine office with varying functions over time. Originally a subaltern officer of the imperial guard regiment (tagma) of the Vigla, it was associated with the command over the famed Varangian Guard in the 11th–12th centuries.

== History ==
The title is first attested in the late 9th century, when the Kletorologion of 899 lists him as one of the senior officers of the Vigla or Arithmos guard regiment (tagma). In the 9th–10th centuries, the akolouthos (often termed ἀκόλουθος τοῦ ἀριθμοῦ, akolouthos tou arithmou, to emphasize his links to the Vigla/Arithmos) was the deputy of the regimental commander, the droungarios tes vigles, i.e. the equivalent of the proximos and the protomandator in the two senior tagmata, the Scholai and the Excubitores. Already at this time, however, he was associated with the command of the foreign mercenaries, chiefly the Franks.

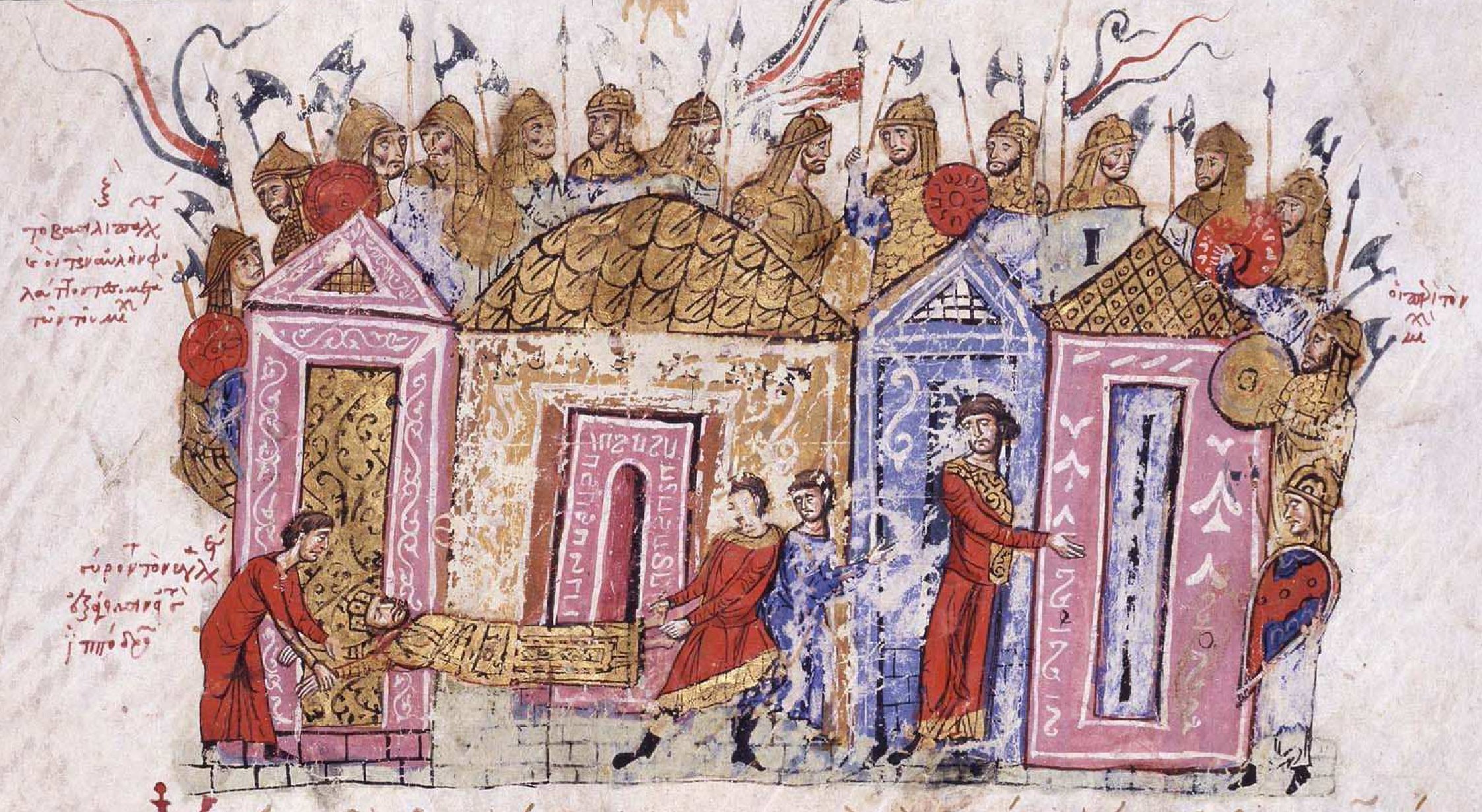
Varangian Guardsmen, an illumination from the Madrid Skylitzes

From the early 11th century, the droungarios tes vigles was entrusted with judicial and police duties in the capital, Constantinople. The post of akolouthos became an independent command, still linked to mercenary contingents, now chiefly the Varangian Guard, which from the Komnenian period on became one of the main, and most enduring, corps of the imperial bodyguard.

In the 12th century however, the akolouthoi are mentioned chiefly in connection with diplomatic missions. The akolouthos is still named as the chief of the Varangians in the mid-14th century Book of Offices of pseudo-Kodinos, but the last attested holder of the post is a certain John Nomikopoulos in 1199. The historian Rodolphe Guilland however considered it very likely that the post continued to exist until the end of the empire, even though no holders are named. According to pseudo-Kodinos, he occupied the 51st place in the palace hierarchy, was always in close attendance to the emperor, and assisted by the "primikerioi of the Varangians". The same work also gives his distinctive court dress: a skiadion hat with gold-wire embroidery, a "plain silk" kabbadion kaftan, and a ceremonial hat called skaranikon, covered with velvet and topped with a red tassel. In the breakaway Empire of Trebizond (1204–1461), the akolouthos was also known as chourtzes (χουρτζής), a title of unknown origin; it is possibly linked to similar Persian or Georgian titles signifying "page".

== Known holders ==
A few akolouthoi are recorded by name in the sources. A patrikios Michael served as akolouthos under Constantine IX Monomachos (r. 1042–1055), and was active as a general against the Pechenegs and the Seljuk Turks. A certain Nampites occupied the post early in the reign of Alexios I Komnenos (r. 1081–1118). Under Manuel I Komnenos (r. 1143–1180), the akolouthos Stephen was sent by the emperor to accompany and guide Conrad III of Germany while crossing Byzantine territory during the Second Crusade (1147). In ca. 1160/61, the post was held by Basil Kamateros, and a little later by Isaac Aaron, who betrayed the emperor's confidence and was blinded in 1171. The last known holder of the office, John Nomikopoulos, is attested in a chrysobull of Alexios III Angelos (r. 1195–1203) from 1199. A handful of seals of akolouthoi are also known, but they cannot be dated or identified with any certainty.

== See also ==
- Ragnvald Ingvarsson

== Sources ==
- Kazhdan, Alexander, ed. (1991). The Oxford Dictionary of Byzantium. Oxford and New York: Oxford University Press. ISBN 0-19-504652-8.
- Guilland, Rodolphe (1960). "Études sur l'histoire administrative de l'empire byzantin: les commandants de la garde impériale, l'ἐπὶ τοῦ στρατοῦ et le juge de l'armée". Revue des études byzantines (in French). 18 (18): 79–96. doi:10.3406/rebyz.1960.1221.
