= Byzantine Empire under the Macedonian dynasty =

Period of Byzantine history from 867 to 1057

Byzantine Empire: Βασιλεία Ῥωμαίων (Ancient Greek); Imperium Romanum (Latin)
- 867–1056
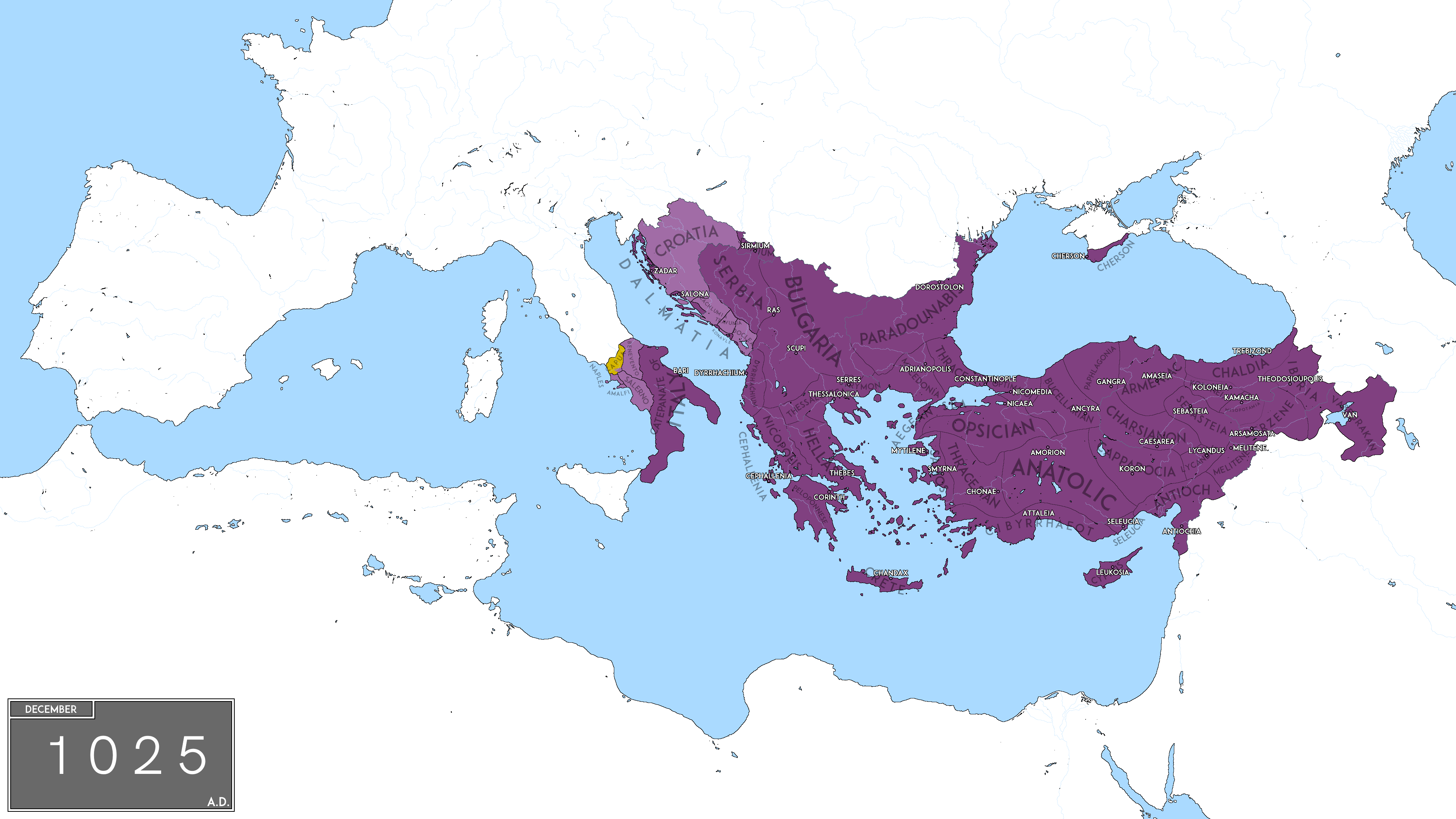
- The Byzantine Empire at the death of Basil II, 1025
- Capital: Constantinople
- Common languages: Medieval Greek (official, widely spoken and lingua franca), Koine Greek (religious), Old Albanian, Eastern Romance languages, Armenian, Old Church Slavonic, South Slavic languages, Syriac language
- Religion: Eastern Orthodox Church
- Government: Monarchy under military rule
- Emperor
  - 867–886: Basil I
  - 1055–1056: Theodora Porphyrogenita
- History
  - Murder of Michael III: 24 September 867
  - Death of Theodora Porphyrogenita: 31 August 1056
Preceded by
Byzantine Empire under the Amorian dynasty
First Bulgarian Empire
Succeeded by
Byzantine Empire under the Doukas dynasty
County of Apulia and Calabria
Catepanate of Ras
Duklja

The Byzantine Empire under the Macedonian dynasty underwent a revival during the late 9th, 10th, and early 11th centuries. Under the Macedonian emperors, the empire gained control over the Adriatic Sea, Southern Italy, and all of the territory of the Tsar Samuil of Bulgaria. The Macedonian dynasty was characterised by a cultural revival in spheres such as philosophy and the arts and has been dubbed the "Golden Age" of Byzantium.

The cities of the empire expanded, and affluence spread across the provinces because of the newfound security. The population rose, and production increased, stimulating new demand for trade.

Culturally, there was considerable growth in education and learning (the "Macedonian Renaissance"). Ancient texts were preserved and recopied. Byzantine art flourished, and brilliant mosaics graced the interiors of the many new churches.

== History ==
=== Internal developments ===
Although tradition attributed the "Byzantine Renaissance" to Basil I (867–886), initiator of the Macedonian dynasty, some later scholars have credited the reforms of Basil's predecessor, Michael III (842–867) and of the erudite Theoktistos (died 855). The latter in particular favoured culture at the court, and, with a careful financial policy, steadily increased gold reserves. The rise of the Macedonian dynasty coincided with developments that strengthened the religious unity of the empire.

The iconoclast movement experienced a steep decline; this favoured its soft suppression by the emperors, and mitigation of the religious strife that had drained resources in previous centuries. Despite some tactical defeats, the administrative, legislative, cultural and economic situation continued to improve under Basil's successors, especially with Romanos I Lekapenos (920–944). The theme system reached its definitive form in this period. The Eastern Orthodox Church establishment began to support the imperial cause, and the state limited the power of the landowning class in favour of agricultural small-holders, who made up an important part of the military. These conditions contributed to the ability of the emperors to wage war against the Arabs.

=== Wars against the Muslims ===
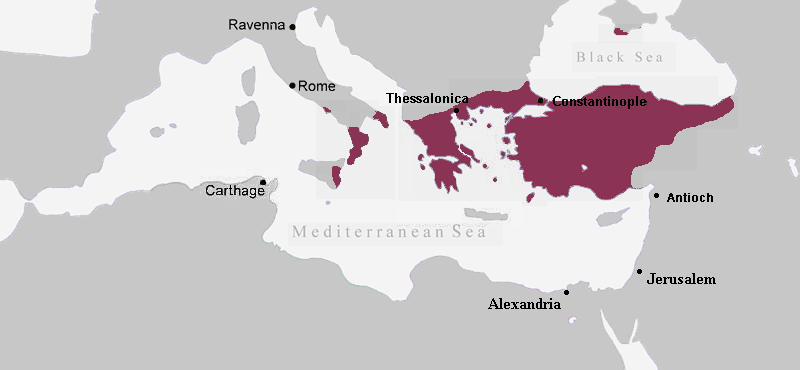
Byzantine Empire, c. 867 AD

By 867, the empire had stabilized its position in both the east and the west, while the success of its defensive military structure had enabled the emperors to begin planning wars of reconquest in the east.

The process of reconquest began with variable fortunes. The temporary reconquest of Crete (843) was followed by a crushing Byzantine defeat on the Bosporus, while the emperors were unable to prevent the ongoing Muslim conquest of Sicily (827–902). Using present-day Tunisia as their launching pad, the Muslims conquered Palermo in 831, Messina in 842, Enna in 859, Syracuse in 878, Catania in 900 and the final Greek stronghold, the fortress of Taormina, in 902.

These drawbacks were later counterbalanced by a victorious expedition against Damietta in Egypt (853), the defeat of the Emir of Melitene (863), the confirmation of the imperial authority over Dalmatia (867) and Basil I's offensives towards the Euphrates (870s).

The threat from the Arab Muslims was meanwhile reduced by inner struggles and by the rise of the Turks in the east. Muslims received assistance however from the Paulician sect, which had found a large following in the eastern provinces of the Empire and, facing persecution under the Byzantines, often fought under the Arab flag. It took several campaigns to subdue the Paulicians, who were eventually defeated by Basil I.

In 904, disaster struck the empire when its second city, Thessaloniki, was sacked by an Arab fleet led by a Byzantine renegade. The Byzantines responded by destroying an Arab fleet in 908, and sacking the city of Laodicea in Syria two years later. Despite this revenge, the Byzantines were still unable to strike a decisive blow against the Muslims, who inflicted a crushing defeat on the imperial forces when they attempted to regain Crete in 911.

The situation on the border with the Arab territories remained fluid, with the Byzantines alternatively on the offensive or defensive. Kievan Rus', who appeared near Constantinople for the first time in 860, constituted another new challenge. In 941 they appeared on the Asian shore of the Bosporus, but this time they were crushed, showing the improvements in the Byzantine military position after 907, when only diplomacy had been able to push back the invaders. The vanquisher of the Rus' was the famous general John Kourkouas, who continued the offensive with other noteworthy victories in Mesopotamia (943): these culminated in the reconquest of Edessa (944), which was especially celebrated for the return to Constantinople of the venerated Mandylion.

The soldier emperors Nikephoros II Phokas (reigned 963–69) and John I Tzimiskes (969–76) expanded the empire well into Syria, defeating the emirs of north-west Iraq and reconquering Crete and Cyprus. At one point under John, the empire's armies even threatened Jerusalem, far to the south. The emirate of Aleppo and its neighbors became vassals of the empire in the east, where the greatest threat to the empire was the Egyptian Fatimids.

=== Wars against Bulgaria ===
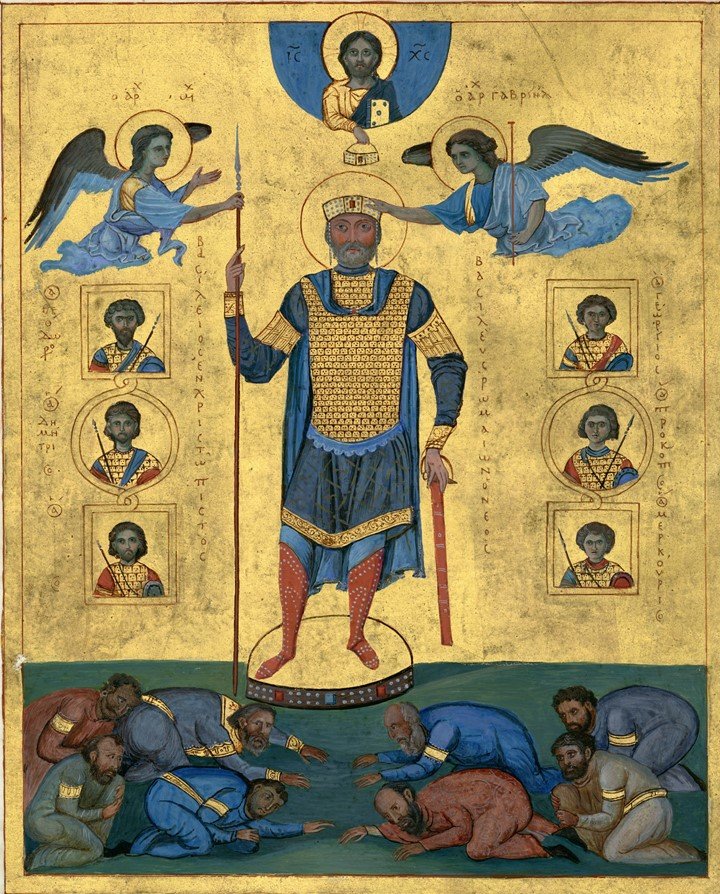
Emperor Basil II the Bulgar Slayer (976–1025).

The traditional struggle with the See of Rome continued, spurred by the question of religious supremacy over the newly Christianized Bulgaria. This prompted an invasion by the mighty Tsar Simeon I in 894, but this was pushed back by Byzantine diplomacy, which called on the help of the Hungarians. The Byzantines were in turn defeated, however, at the Battle of Bulgarophygon (896), and obliged to pay annual subsidies to the Bulgarians. Later (912) Simeon even had the Byzantines grant him the crown of basileus of Bulgaria and had the young emperor Constantine VII marry one of his daughters. When a revolt in Constantinople halted his dynastic project, he again invaded Thrace and conquered Adrianople.

A great imperial expedition under Leo Phokas and Romanos Lekapenos ended again with a crushing Byzantine defeat at the Battle of Anchialus (917). The following year the Bulgarians ravaged modern-day northern Greece south to Corinth. Adrianople was captured again in 923 and in 924 the Bulgarian army laid siege to Constantinople. Pressure from the North was alleviated only after Simeon's death in 927.

Under the emperor Basil II (reigned 976–1025), Bulgaria became the target of annual campaigns by the Byzantine army. The war was to drag on for nearly twenty years, but eventually, at the Battle of Kleidon the Bulgarian forces were completely defeated. and captured. According to medieval legends, 99 out of every 100 Bulgarian soldiers were blinded and the hundredth remaining man was left with one eye so as to lead his compatriots home; reportedly when the aging Tsar Samuil of Bulgaria saw the remains of his once formidable army, he died of a heart attack. In 1018 Bulgaria surrendered and became part of the Byzantine Empire thus restoring the Danube frontier, which had not been held since the days of Heraclius.

During this period the Byzantine princess Theophanu, wife of the Holy Roman Emperor Otto II, served as regent of the Holy Roman Empire, paving the way for the westward spread of Byzantine culture.

=== Relations with Kievan Rus' ===
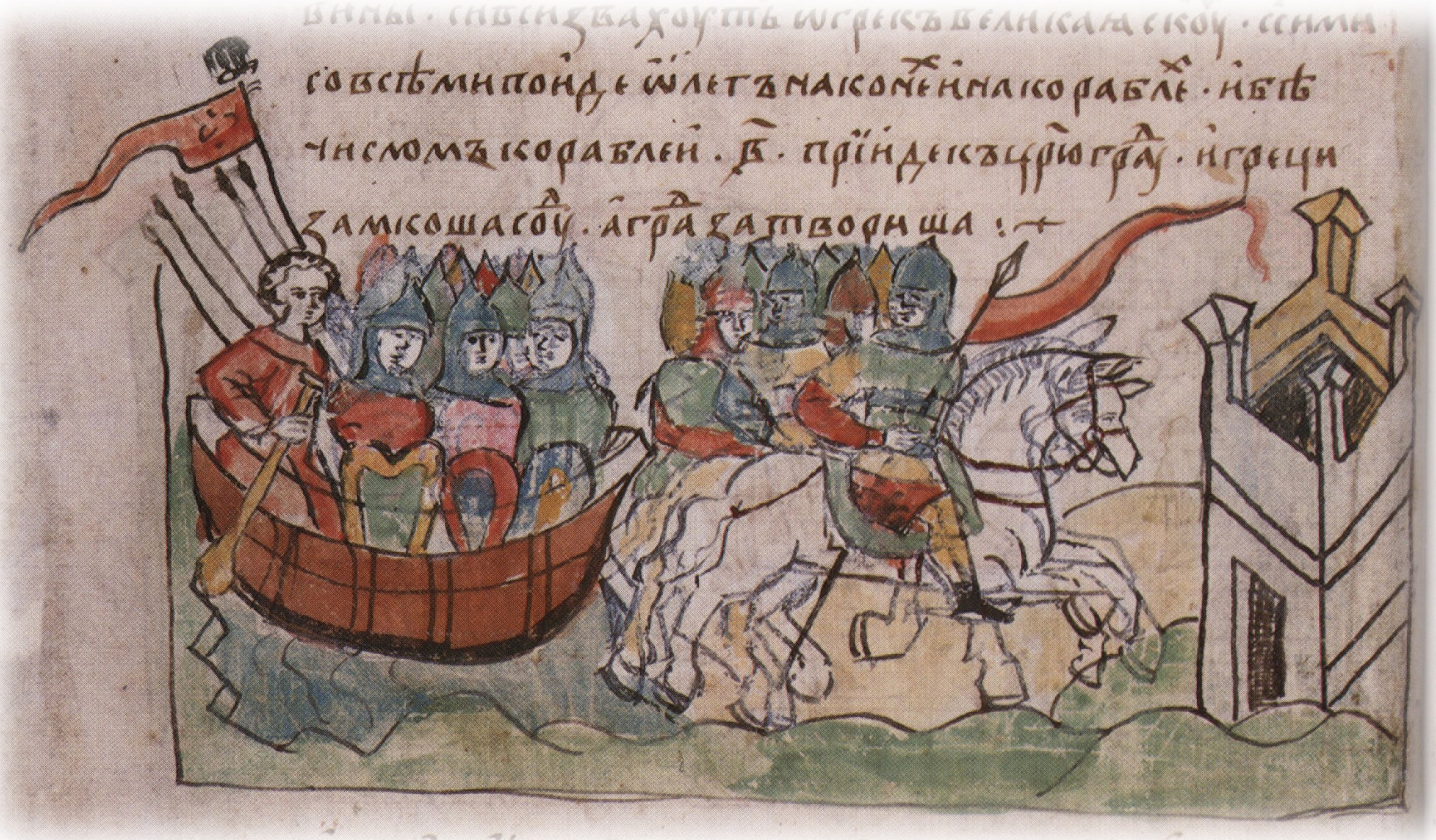
Prince Oleg leads a squadron of horse-driven boats to the walls of Tsargrad. A medieval Kievan Rus' illumination (907)

Between 800 and 1100, the empire developed a mixed relationship with the new state of Kievan Rus' that emerged to the north across the Black Sea.

The Byzantine Empire quickly became the main trading and cultural partner for Kiev. After Christianizing, Rus' Vladimir the Great employed many architects and artists to work on numerous cathedrals and churches around Rus', expanding the Byzantine influence even further.

Kievan Rus' princes were often married into the Byzantine imperial family and Constantinople often employed princes' armies; most notably, Vladimir the Great presented Byzantium with the famous Varangian Guard – an army of vicious Scandinavian mercenaries. Some believe that this was in exchange for the marriage of Basil's sister Anna to Vladimir. However, the Primary Chronicle states the marriage was in exchange for the Rus' conversion to orthodoxy; the Varangian Guard was a by-product (although a significant one) of this exchange.

The relationship was not always friendly. During this three-hundred-year interval Constantinople and other Byzantine cities were attacked several times by the armies of Kievan Rus' (see Rus'-Byzantine Wars). Kiev never went far enough to actually endanger the empire; the wars were primarily a tool to force the Byzantines to sign increasingly favorable trade treaties, the texts of which are recorded in the Primary Chronicle (Rus'–Byzantine Treaty (907)) and other historical documents. Constantinople at the same time constantly pitted Kievan Rus', Bulgaria, and Poland against each other.

The Byzantine influence on Kievan Rus' cannot be overstated. Byzantine-style writing became a standard for the adopted from Bulgaria Cyrillic alphabet, Byzantine architecture dominated in Kiev, and as the main trading partner the Byzantine Empire played a critical role in the establishment, rise, and fall of Kievan Rus'.

=== Triumph ===
The themata of the Byzantine Empire at the death of Basil II in 1025.

The Byzantine Empire now stretched to Armenia in the east, to Calabria in Southern Italy in the west. Many successes had been achieved, ranging from the conquest of Bulgaria, to the annexation of parts of Georgia and Armenia, to the total annihilation of an invading force of Egyptians outside Antioch. Yet even these victories were not enough; Basil considered the continued Arab occupation of Sicily to be an outrage. Accordingly, he planned to reconquer the island, which had belonged to the empire for over three hundred years (c. 535 – c. 902). However, his death in 1025 put an end to the project.

The 11th century was also momentous for its religious events. In 1054, relations between Greek and Slavic-speaking Eastern and Latin-speaking Western Christian traditions reached a terminal crisis. Although there was a formal declaration of institutional separation, on July 16, when three papal legates entered the Hagia Sophia during Divine Liturgy on a Saturday afternoon and placed a bull of ex-communication on the altar, the so-called Great Schism was a culmination of centuries of gradual separation. Although the schism was brought about by doctrinal disputes (in particular, Eastern refusal to accept the Western Church doctrine of the filioque, or double procession of the Holy Spirit), disputes over administration and political issues had simmered for centuries. The formal separation of the Eastern Orthodox Church and the Western Catholic Church would have wide-ranging consequences for the future of Europe and Christianity.

== Administration ==
The Macedonian dynasty presided over significant administrative reforms, most notably in law, governance, and provincial organization. Among these, the Basilika represented the most important legal codification of the era. It was a massive 60-book legal codification of Byzantine law written in Greek which would be in use till the empire's demise in 1453. First commissioned under Basil I and finished by his son Leo VI.

=== Policies of Subsequent Emperors ===
The emperors that followed Basil I and Leo VI like Romanos I Lekapenos, Nikephoros II and John I Tzimiskes introduced reforms to curb the power of the powerful Anatolian aristocrats called the "Dynatoi" who had been buying land from commoners and increasing their power day-by-day. In 996, Basil II issued a law targeting Dynatoi landowners, demanding restitution of lands acquired illegally and requiring proof of title. These actions increased his popularity among the peasants greatly which served as a loyal manpower base, allowing the empire to raise loyal troops in vast quantities when needed.

=== Fiscal Policy and Taxation ===
The Macedonian emperors introduced fiscal policies aimed at protecting the empire’s agrarian tax base and limiting the influence of wealthy landowners. Their measures focused on safeguarding smallholding peasants, whose farms provided stable revenue for the state. Basil II's legislation of 996 required powerful landlords to return lands they had taken unlawfully and to present proof of legitimate ownership, which helped keep village communities intact and taxable. A major part of these policies was the allelengyon, a rule that made rich landowners responsible for paying the taxes owed by poorer peasants in their area. This discouraged the aristocracy from absorbing peasant lands and ensured that the state did not lose revenue, while also preserving a loyal rural population that could supply soldiers when needed.

=== Military Administration ===
Under the Macedonian dynasty, the military and administrative structure of the empire underwent significant reform, especially under Basil II. His legislations targeted the powerful Anatolian aristocratic families known as the Dynatoi, who had been steadily accumulating the lands of smallholding peasants. By restricting their expansion and protecting peasant property, Basil II strengthened central authority, gained widespread support among the rural population, and secured a loyal manpower base for the imperial army.

==== Tagmata ====
The Tagmata the professional standing army of the empire grew in size by Basil II's time the Tagmata included units like the Scholai, Excubitors, Vigla, Hikanatoi, Manglabitai, Noumeroi, Vestiaritai and the Teichistai. However, under Basil II a new inclusion the Varangian Guard was added being elite and feared Norsemen personally loyal to the emperor.

== Timeline ==
- Red denotes Senior Emperors
- Pink denotes Junior Emperors

== See also ==
- Macedonian dynasty and related family tree
- Family trees of the Byzantine imperial dynasties
- Lekapenos
- Phokas (Byzantine family)
