= Vigla (tagma) =

Vigla or Arithmos
- Active: 8th century–11th century
- Disbanded: Unknown; last attested in 949
- Country: Byzantine Empire
- Type: heavy cavalry, imperial guard
- Garrison/HQ: Constantinople, Bithynia, Thrace

Commanders
- Notable commanders: Alexios Mosele, Petronas, Eustathios Argyros, John Kourkouas

The Vigla (Greek: Βίγλα, "guard watch", from Latin: vigilia), also known as the Arithmos (Greek: Ἀριθμός, "Number") and in English as the Watch, was one of the elite tagmata of the Byzantine army. It was established in the latter half of the 8th century, and survived until the late 11th century. Along with the Noumeroi regiment, the Vigla formed the guard of the imperial palace in Constantinople, and was responsible for the Byzantine emperor's safety on expeditions.

== History and functions ==
The Vigla or Arithmos was the third of the imperial tagmata to be established, with its commander attested for the first time in 791. Both names derive from the Latin terminology of the Late Roman army: the term vigilia was applied from the 4th century onto any kind of guard detachment, while arithmos is the Greek translation of the Latin numerus, both titles being used in a generic sense for "regiment". In literary sources, Vigla is more commonly used than Arithmos, and is also the title used in the seals of its commanders.

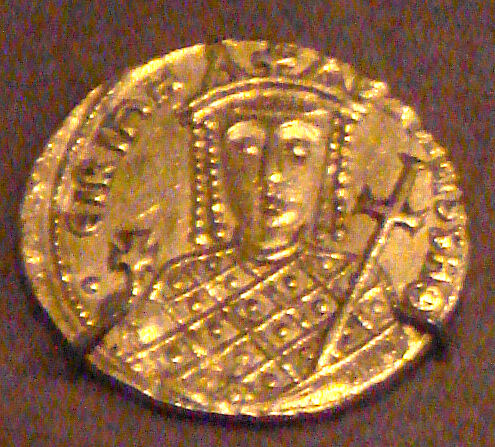
The Empress Irene of Athens (r. 797–802), held according to one theory to have created the tagma of the Vigla.

Its exact date of creation is contested among modern historians of the Byzantine army: Byzantinist John Haldon considers that the Vigla was established as a tagma by the Empress Irene in the 780s out of a provincial brigade, but Warren Treadgold supports its creation along with the first two tagmata, the Scholai ("Schools") and Exkoubitoi ("Excubitors"), by Emperor Constantine V (r. 741–775) in the mid-8th century. If the former hypothesis is true, then the establishment of the Vigla by Irene may have been intended to counterbalance the two older tagmata, which remained loyal to iconoclasm and resented Irene's iconophile policies. The provincial parent unit, in turn, appears to have been of considerable ancestry: the presence of archaic Late Roman titles for its officers points to an origin, possibly as a cavalry vexillation, in the old East Roman army before the Muslim conquests of the 7th century. John B. Bury has traced a hypothetical lineage to the early 5th-century vexillationes palatinae of the Comites Arcadiaci, the Comites Honoriaci and the Equites Theodosiaci.

As the name indicates, the Vigla was tasked with guard duties, both in the imperial palace and on campaign. Unlike the other cavalry tagmata, which were mostly garrisoned outside Constantinople in Thrace and Bithynia, the Vigla had a significant presence in the capital. There, its task was guarding the imperial palace, along with the less prestigious infantry tagmata of the Noumeroi (responsible also for the palace prisons) and the Teicheiōtai (guarding the city walls). More specifically, within Constantinople, the Vigla guarded the most exposed western, city-ward perimeter of the palace precinct, and kept a permanent garrison at the Covered Hippodrome, which was left in place even when the rest of the unit was on campaign, and secured the safety of the emperor while he was outside the Palace. As the regimental commander, the droungarios tēs viglas (δρουγγάριος τῆς βίγλας) was always in attendance to the emperor, the Vigla could go on campaign without him, in which case it came under the orders of the Domestic of the Schools. On expeditions led by the emperor himself, the droungarios was responsible for the safety of the camp and especially the night watch, relaying the emperor's orders, the advance, rear and flank guards during marches, and guarding prisoners of war.

In comparison to the other three "classical" tagmata of the Scholai, Exkoubitoi, and Hikanatoi, the Vigla is mentioned infrequently in the historical sources of the 9th–10th centuries. This is possibly due to the peculiar duties and role of the regiment on campaign, as it was responsible for the internal security of the imperial camp, rather than a battle-line formation; the regiment may also have been numerically much smaller than the other tagmata. Members of the unit are recorded as participating in a campaign to southern Italy in 935 and in the Cretan expedition of 949, but the sources are silent about its subsequent history and eventual disbandment.

== Organisation ==
As with the other tagmata, the issue of the unit's size is a matter of controversy. Warren Treadgold considers the tagmata to have numbered a standard 4,000 men each, while other scholars, notably John Haldon, argue in favour of a much lower size of c. 1,000 men. The structure of the imperial tagmata, however, was uniform and is well-attested, with minor variations, mostly in titulature, reflecting the different origins of the units.

Uniquely among the tagmata, and perhaps a reflection of its ancestry, since it was more common in the 6th century, the commander of the Vigla bore the title of droungarios, in English sometimes rendered as "Drungary of the Watch". The first known holder of the office was Alexios Mosele in 791. Due to his proximity to the emperor, the droungarios was usually a close and trusted aide, as well as one of the senior military officers of the state. In the 10th century, the office was given to some of the most distinguished scions of the Byzantine military aristocracy, but from circa 1030 on, it was transformed into a civil office with judicial responsibilities. In this capacity, it survived well beyond the regiment's demise and unto the end of the Palaiologan period.

Under the droungarios were one or two topotērētai (sing. topotērētēs, τοποτηρητής, lit. "placeholder, lieutenant"), a chartoularios (χαρτουλάριος [τοῦ ἀριθμοῦ]) as head of the commander's secretariat, and the akolouthos, a title unique to the Vigla but corresponding to similar subaltern officers, the proximos of the Scholai and the prōtomandatōr of the Exkoubitoi. The unit was divided into twenty banda (sing. bandon, βάνδον, from Latin: bandum, "banner"), each of theoretically 50 men, commanded by a komēs (κόμης [τοῦ ἀριθμοῦ], "count [of the arithmos]"). In turn, each of these commanded five kentarchoi (sing. kentarchos, κένταρχος, "centurion").

Among the lower ranks within each tagma were two further classes of subaltern officers, the bandophoroi (βανδοφόροι, "banner-bearers") and the mandatores (μανδάτορες, "messengers"). Each tagma numbered forty of the bandophoroi, divided into four different classes of ten, with differing titles in each unit. For the Vigla in particular, these titles can be traced to the standard Roman cavalry ranks of the 5th–6th centuries. These were: the bandophoroi, the labourisioi (λαβουρίσιοι, a corruption of 6th-century labarēsioi, "carriers of the labarum"), the sēmeiophoroi (σημειοφόροι, "bearers of an insigne", cf. the Late Roman semafori), and the doukiniatores (δουκινιάτορες, again a corruption of the Latin ducenarii of the Late Roman military). The Vigla also was unique in having several ranks of messengers: along with the ordinary mandatores present in the other units, it included legatarioi (λεγατάριοι, "legatees"), thyrōroi (θυρωροί, "doorkeepers"), skoutarioi (σκουτάριοι, "shield-bearers") and diatrechontes (διατρέχοντες, "runners"). Only a handful of subaltern officers of the Vigla are known, from their lead seals of office.

== Sources ==
- Bury, J. B. (1911). The Imperial Administrative System of the Ninth Century – With a Revised Text of the Kletorologion of Philotheos. London: Oxford University Press. OCLC 1046639111.
- Guilland, Rodolphe (1967). "Le Drongaire et le Grand drongaire de la Veille". Recherches sur les institutions byzantines, Tome I (in French). Berlin: Akademie-Verlag. pp. 563–587.
- Haldon, John F. (1984). Byzantine Praetorians. An Administrative, Institutional and Social Survey of the Opsikion and Tagmata, c. 580-900. Bonn: Dr. Rudolf Habelt GmbH. ISBN 3-7749-2004-4.
- Haldon, John F. (1995). Mango, Cyril; Dagron, Gilbert (eds.). "Strategies of Defence, Problems of Security: the Garrisons of Constantinople in the Middle Byzantine Period". Constantinople and Its Hinterland: Papers from the Twenty-Seventh Spring Symposium of Byzantine Studies, Oxford, April 1993. Ashgate Publishing. Archived from the original on 2009-08-26.
- Haldon, John (1999). Warfare, State and Society in the Byzantine World, 565–1204. London: UCL Press. ISBN 1-85728-495-X.
- Kazhdan, Alexander, ed. (1991). The Oxford Dictionary of Byzantium. Oxford and New York: Oxford University Press. ISBN 0-19-504652-8.
- Kühn, Hans-Joachim (1991). Die byzantinische Armee im 10. und 11. Jahrhundert: Studien zur Organisation der Tagmata (in German). Vienna: Fassbaender Verlag. ISBN 3-9005-38-23-9.
- Treadgold, Warren T. (1980). "Notes on the Numbers and Organisation of the Ninth-Century Byzantine Army". Greek, Roman and Byzantine Studies. 21. Oxford: 269–288.
- Treadgold, Warren T. (1995). Byzantium and Its Army, 284–1081. Stanford, California: Stanford University Press. ISBN 0-8047-3163-2.
- Whittow, Mark (1996). The Making of Byzantium, 600–1025. Berkeley and Los Angeles, California: University of California Press. ISBN 978-0-520-20496-6.
