= Basilikos =

Basilikos (Greek: βασιλικός), is a Greek epithet deriving from the title basileus, and means "royal" or "imperial". It can refer to:

== Titles ==
The epithet featured frequently in the titulature of Hellenistic and Byzantine courts:

- Basilikos anthropos, a term with a number of meanings in Byzantine documents of the 9th–10th centuries
- Basilikos mandator, a subaltern official in the middle Byzantine Empire
- Basilikos grammateus, or Royal Secretary, communicates a sovereign's wishes to the other members of government
- Philos basilikos, a term for hierarchic systems of titles specifically in use for court protocol

== People ==
- Basil Basilikos (fl. 1260s), parakoimomenos of Byzantine emperor Michael VIII
- Basilikos (fl. 1300), protoierakarios of the Byzantine emperor Andronikos II
