= Spatharokandidatos =

Byzantine court dignity, 7th–11th centuries

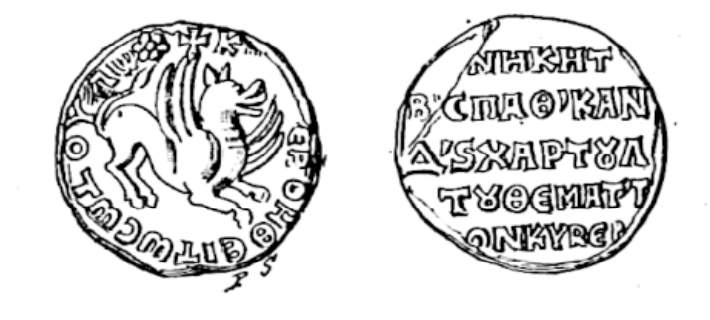
Seal of Niketas, spatharokandidatos and chartoularios of the Cibyrrhaeots (10th/11th century)

Spatharokandidatos (Greek: σπαθαροκανδιδᾶτος), Latinized as spatharocandidatus, was a mid-ranking Byzantine court dignity used in the 7th–11th centuries.

== History ==
The title was created as a portmanteau of the titles spatharios and kandidatos, both of which were types of palace guards in the 4th–6th centuries. The earliest references to the title occur in the History of Sebeos and in a letter by Pope Gregory II to Emperor Leo III the Isaurian (r. 717–741). John B. Bury accepted a creation in the early 7th century, but the title is clearly attested only from the early 9th century on. In the 9th-century lists of precedence (Taktika), the dignity ranks below that of dishypatos and above that of spatharios among the dignities intended for 'bearded men' (i.e. non-eunuchs). Its distinctive insigne (brabeion) was a golden chain (maniakion) worn around the chest.

The dignity was not given to eunuchs, for whom the corresponding dignity was that of spatharokoubikoularios. Judging from sigillographic evidence, the dignity was associated mostly with mid-level ranks, such as notarioi and lower judges. In the lists of offices known as the Taktika, the dignity corresponds to specific positions in the lower tier of the senior civil and military hierarchy, such as those of asekretis (senior secretary), kleisourarches (commander of a frontier district), topoteretes (deputy commander) of a tagma, or tourmarches (divisional commander) of a thema. The last attested mention of the title is in 1094, and it was dropped from use at the latest in the 12th century.

== In popular culture ==
In Season 3, Episode 3 of the historical drama series Vikings: Valhalla, the characters representing the Byzantine general Georgios Maniakes and the Viking Harald Sigurdsson (Harald Hardrada) are depicted receiving it as reward for a victory in Sicily. Hardrada is played by Leo Suter, and Maniakes is played by Florian Munteanu.

== Sources ==
- Bury, J. B.; Philotheus (1911). The Imperial Administrative System of the Ninth Century (With a Revised Text of the Kletorologion of Philotheos). London: Oxford University Press.
- Kazhdan, Alexander (1991). "Spatharokandidatos". In Kazhdan, Alexander (ed.). The Oxford Dictionary of Byzantium. Oxford and New York: Oxford University Press. p. 1936. ISBN 0-19-504652-8.
