= Nikephoros Lykaon =

Byzantine governor

Nikephoros Lykaon or Lalakon (Greek: Νικηφόρος Λυκάων or Λαλάκων) was a Byzantine protospatharios and strategos of Naissus in ca. 1050. He is known only through his seal.
