= Numerus =

Numerus (Latin: "number") may refer to one of the following

- Grammatical number
- Numerus, a military unit of the Roman army

See also

- Roman numerals
