= Atriklines =

The atriklines (Greek: ἀτρικλίνης, plural atriklinai) was a Byzantine court official responsible for organizing feasts and banquets in the imperial palace. Along with maintaining order at imperial banquets, he was tasked with ensuring that guests were received in the correct order of precedence according to their court rank and office. The atriklines performed and fulfilled his duties by utilizing a list known as a kletorologion (κλητορολόγιον) containing the officials, dignitaries, and ministers who possessed the right to be entertained in the palace. The roster itself would undergo alterations in order to account for the establishment of new offices, the elimination of old offices, and changes made to the guest order of precedence. A prominent atriklines was a certain Philotheos, who in 899 held the imperial title of protospatharios and authored the only surviving example of a kletorologion. The office cannot be traced later than the 11th century.

The term atriklines is of Latin origin, from triclinium (dining hall), but it was often distorted into artoklines or artiklines (ἀρτικλίνης) through the influence of Greek artos (bread).

== Sources ==
- Bury, John Bagnell (1911). The Imperial Administrative System of the Ninth Century - With a Revised Text of the Kletorologion of Philotheos. London: Oxford University Press.
- Kazhdan, Alexander (1991). "Atriklines". In Kazhdan, Alexander (ed.). The Oxford Dictionary of Byzantium. Oxford and New York: Oxford University Press. ISBN 0-19-504652-8.
- Neville, Leonora Alice (2004). Authority in Byzantine Provincial Society, 950-1100. Cambridge, UK: Cambridge University Press. ISBN 978-0-52-183865-8.
- Tougher, Shaun (2008). The Eunuch in Byzantine History and Society. New York, NY: Routledge. ISBN 978-0-20-386620-7.
