= Epi tes katastaseos =

Byzantine court office

The epi tes katastaseos (Greek: ἐπὶ τῆς καταστάσεως) was a court office of the Byzantine Empire, attested in the 9th–10th centuries.

The origin and exact nature of the office are unclear. J. B. Bury translated the title as "master of ceremonies" since katastasis may be interpreted as "order", and derived its origin from the late Roman comes dispositionum, the head of the scrinium dispositionum, a department under the authority of the magister officiorum. George Ostrogorsky and Ernst Stein on the other hand pointed out that the scrinium dispositionum ceases to be mentioned after 534, and suggested that the epi tes katastaseos was a descendant of the comes admissionum, attested from the time of Justinian I (reigned 527–565) on.

The mid-9th century Taktikon Uspensky is ambiguous as to its role, placing the office first among the civil officials (between the protonotarios tou dromou and the archon tou armamentou) and then among the lower-ranking courtiers. The Kletorologion of 899 records the office as one of the "special dignities" (eidikai axiai), and records that his staff comprised the orders (taxeis) of hypatoi, vestitores, silentiarioi, the apo eparchontes, and the synkletikoi ("senators", which Bury suggests might be emended to stratelatai), although most of them were ranks of dignitaries rather than court functionaries. The De Ceremoniis, compiled in the later 10th century, on the other hand, places the office firmly among the court officials, usually in conjunction with the silentiarioi.

== Sources ==
- Bury, J. B.; Philotheus (1911). The Imperial Administrative System of the Ninth Century (With a Revised Text of the Kletorologion of Philotheos). London: Oxford University Press.
- Kazhdan, Alexander, ed. (1991). The Oxford Dictionary of Byzantium. Oxford and New York: Oxford University Press. ISBN 0-19-504652-8.
