= Vestitor =

The vestitor, Hellenized as vestētōr (Greek: βεστήτωρ) was a lowly Byzantine palace position and rank.

As their name suggests, the vestitores were originally officials of the imperial wardrobe (Latin: vestiarium, adopted into Greek as vestiarion), and are first attested as such in the 6th century. By the 9th century, the title had also become an honorary dignity (δια βραβείου άξια, dia brabeiou axia) intended for "bearded men" (i.e. non-eunuchs), marked in the Klētorologion of 899 as the third-lowest of the imperial hierarchy, coming between the silentiarios and the mandatōr (both also classes of palace officials). Its distinctive insignia was a fiblatorium, a cloak fastened by a fibula brooch.

According to the Klētorologion, together with the silentiarioi, the vestētores were under the command of the court official known as the epi tēs katastaseōs. The later De Ceremoniis of Emperor Constantine VII Porphyrogennetos (r. 913–959) indicates that they assisted the praipositos in dressing the emperor, while the chronicler Theophanes the Confessor calls them wardens of the imperial crown. From sigillographic evidence, in the 9th century the rank was held by senior provincial officials, i.e. prōtonotarioi (heads of the civil administration) and kommerkiarioi (customs officials) of the themes. The term last occurs in the 10th century.

== Sources ==
- Bury, J. B. (1911). The Imperial Administrative System of the Ninth Century – With a Revised Text of the Kletorologion of Philotheos. London: Oxford University Press. OCLC 1046639111.
- Kazhdan, Alexander (1991). "Vestitor". In Kazhdan, Alexander (ed.). The Oxford Dictionary of Byzantium. Oxford and New York: Oxford University Press. p. 2164. ISBN 0-19-504652-8.
