= Stratarches =

Term in the Greek military

Stratarches (Greek: στρατάρχης, pl.: στρατάρχαι (archaic) or στρατάρχες (modern)) means 'ruler of the army' in Greek, and is a title associated with successful generals. In modern Greek usage, it corresponds to the rank of Field Marshal.

== Byzantine Empire ==
The term originated in the Byzantine Empire, where, in the 9th to 11th centuries, the stratarchai were a class of senior officials in charge of military finances and administration, including the hetaireiarches (commander of the foreign imperial guards), the droungarios of the Fleet, the logothetes ton agelon who supervised the army's horse-breeding farms, the komes tou staulou (Count of the Stable) and the protospatharios of the basilikoi anthropoi.

By the late 11th century, this technical meaning was forgotten, and the term stratarches, along with variants such as megas stratarches ('grand stratarches') and panstratarches ('all-stratarches'), came to be used as an honorific epithet for important generals. In this use it is for instance used to describe the famed literary hero Digenis Akritas, or famous past commanders, such as Belisarius.

== Modern Greece ==
Stratarches Στρατάρχης
- Rank insignia during the Kingdom of Greece
- Country: Kingdom of Greece
- Service branch: Hellenic Army
- Rank group: General officer
- Abolished: 1973
- Next lower rank: Strategos
- Equivalent ranks: Archinavarchos

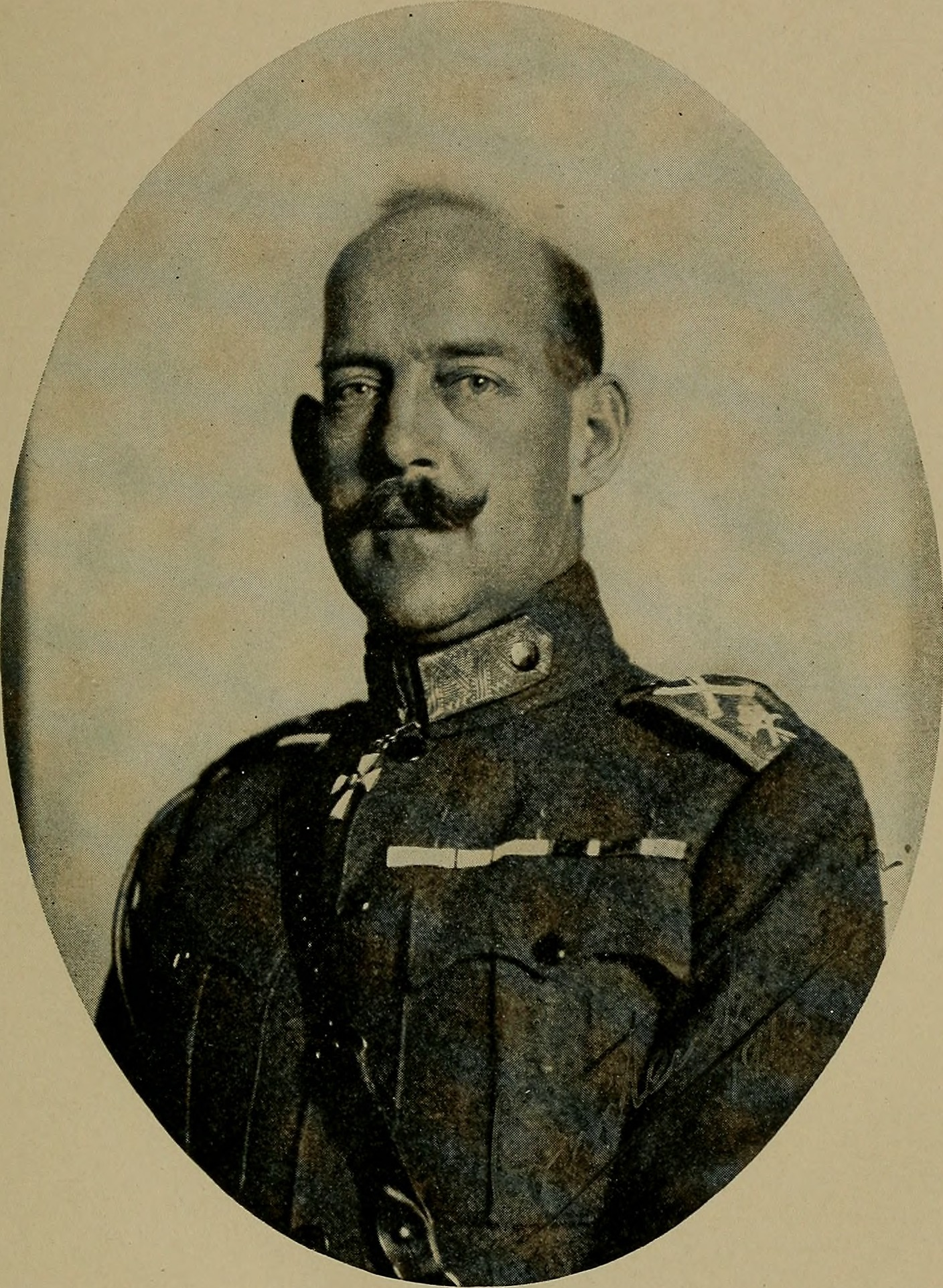
King Constantine I in 1913 with the Marshal insignia

In modern Greek history, the title (modern phonetic transliteration: stratarchis) retains the connotation of a victorious commander, and has been used unofficially for the two most successful Greek field commanders of the Greek War of Independence: Theodoros Kolokotronis in the Morea (Peloponnese) and Georgios Karaiskakis in Roumeli (Central Greece).

As a technical term, it is also used to render in Greek the rank and dignity of field marshal. In this capacity, the rank was first awarded to King Constantine I in 1913, following the victorious Balkan Wars. It was awarded again to his son, King George II, in 1939, and was held ex officio by his successors, Paul and Constantine II up to the abolition of the Greek monarchy in 1973–74. These kings also held the equivalent ranks in the navy and air force.

Apart from the reigning monarchs, only one professional officer has been awarded the rank: General Alexandros Papagos, who was awarded it on 28 October 1949 in recognition of his services during the Greco-Italian War and the Greek Civil War.

In addition, Lieutenant General Theodoros Grivas was bestowed the rank on 23 October 1862 for his leadership in the revolt that led to the ousting of King Otto, but died the following day, before it could be conferred to him in person.

The rank has not been retained by the current Third Hellenic Republic.
