= Dishypatos =

Byzantine honorary dignity, 9th–11th centuries

Dishypatos, Latinized as dishypatus (Greek: δισύπατος, lit. 'twice hypatos'), was a Byzantine honorary dignity (διὰ βραβείου ἀξία, dia brabeiou axia) in the 9th–11th centuries, intended for "bearded men" (i.e. non-eunuchs). From then on, and especially during the Palaiologan period, it is attested as a family name.

The title is relatively rarely mentioned in literary sources, and few seals of dishypatoi have been found. Likely created in the 8th century, it is first attested in the early 9th century, when a certain Thomas, addressee of Theodore the Studite, held the title. Nevertheless, in the Kletorologion, compiled in 899 by Byzantine court official Philotheos, it ranks quite high, being placed below the protospatharios and above the spatharokandidatos. The Kletorologion also mentions that its characteristic insigne of the rank (βραβείον, brabeion) was a diploma. The title seems to have disappeared in Byzantium itself by the late 11th century, but it is still attested during the 12th century in Byzantine-influenced southern Italy. In the same period, 'Dishypatos' begins to appear as a surname, becoming more common after the 13th century, when it also became connected with the reigning Palaiologos dynasty. Among its most notable members were the kanstresios Manuel Dishypatos and the 14th-century Palamite monk David Dishypatos.

== Sources ==
- Bury, J. B. (1911). The Imperial Administrative System of the Ninth Century – With a Revised Text of the Kletorologion of Philotheos. London: Oxford University Press. OCLC 1046639111.
- Kazhdan, Alexander P. (1991). "Dishypatos". In Kazhdan, Alexander (ed.). The Oxford Dictionary of Byzantium. Oxford and New York: Oxford University Press. p. 638. ISBN 0-19-504652-8.
