= Basilikoi anthropoi =

The term basilikoi anthropoi (Greek: βασιλικοί ἄνθρωποι, "the imperial men") appears in Byzantine documents of the 9th–10th centuries and has two distinct meanings:

- as a generic term, it is used by the manuals on court ceremony like the Kletorologion of 899 to indicate the highest-ranking imperial functionaries
- as a more technical term, it referred to a rather lowly class of imperial servants which possibly constituted a special military detachment.

The latter group included holders of minor dignities like stratores and spatharokandidatoi and was headed by the protospatharios of the basilikoi anthropoi, later (in the De Ceremoniis and the Escorial Taktikon) also called the katepano of the basilikoi. He was aided by a domestikos and his staff included "kandidatoi of the Hippodrome", basilikoi mandatores and spatharioi, the latter of whom sometimes appear to participate in military actions, which led Nicolas Oikonomides to suggest that the basilikoi anthropoi may have formed a distinct military unit. Several of the lower ranks of this corps seem to have been foreigners, including Khazars, Arabs, Franks etc.

== Sources ==
- Kazhdan, Alexander (1991). "Basilikoi anthropoi". In Kazhdan, Alexander (ed.). The Oxford Dictionary of Byzantium. Oxford University Press. p. 266. ISBN 978-0-19-504652-6.
