= Noumeroi =

The Noumeroi (Greek: [οἱ] Νούμεροι, masculine plural) or Noumera ([τὰ] Nούμερα, neuter plural, from the Latin numerus, "number" in the sense of "regiment") were a Byzantine infantry garrison unit for the imperial capital, Constantinople. Their main task involved the protection of the Great Palace of Constantinople and of the Noumera, one of the city's prisons.

== History and functions ==
The origin and date of establishment of the Noumeroi is unknown. They are first securely attested during the reign of Michael III (r. 842–867): the unit is mentioned in the Taktikon Uspensky of 842/843, and the name of one of its commanders, Leo Lalakon, also survives from the same period. J.B. Bury considered a seal of the 7th–8th centuries mentioning a "droungarios tou nou[merou?]" as an indication of a predecessor of the 9th-century unit, and based on the nomenclature of its subaltern officers hypothesized an origin in the East Roman army of the 6th century, while John Haldon traces its hypothetical lineage to the late 7th century. The unit survived until the 11th century, when it ceases to be mentioned, indicating that it was dissolved.

The precise title of this unit remains uncertain. In Byzantine literature it is documented only in the genitive plural (τῶν Νουμέρων), which leaves unclear whether the unit title was Noumeroi (Νούμεροι) or Noumera (Νούμερα). Modern scholars over the past century have variously favoured both forms. The term noumeros (transliterated from Latin: numerus, in Greek also translated as arithmos) was itself a common term for a regular military unit of indeterminate size used in Late Antiquity. It was only later, in the 8th and possibly even in the 9th century, that the name came to specify this particular unit. The regiment in turn gave its name to the Noumera, a building adjoining the Hippodrome of Constantinople that served as their barracks and as a city prison. The French scholar Rodolphe Guilland identified the 9th-century Noumera with the prison known as Prandiara in earlier times.

The Noumeroi ranked among the imperial tagmata, professional regiments stationed in and around Constantinople. Unlike most of the tagmata, the Noumeroi were composed of infantry and never left Constantinople, being entrusted with guard duties in the city, specifically watching over the Noumera prison and sharing the protection of the Great Palace of Constantinople with two other tagmata, the Vigla or Arithmos, a cavalry unit which accompanied the emperor on campaign, and another infantry unit under the Count or Domestic of the Walls (komēs/domestikos ton teichōn). The latter had close ties with the Noumeroi: they shared a common function and had the same internal structure, and until the reign of Michael III at least, the two commands seem to have been combined under a single officer, as attested in the person of a certain Nikephoritzes during this time. The Count and his men were originally responsible for the defence of the Anastasian Wall, and later, like the Noumeroi, charged with the supervision of the Chalke prison and guard duties in the Great Palace.

== Command structure ==
Like most of the tagmata, the commander of the Noumeroi bore the title of Domestic (domestikos tōn Noumerōn, δομέστικος τῶν Νουμέρων), usually named simply ho noumeros (ὁ νούμερος). Based on surviving seals, in the 9th century he usually bore the ranks of spatharios or prōtospatharios. As with the other commanders of the tagmata, the Domestic of the Noumeroi played an important role in court ceremonies, and was associated with the racing faction of the Blues, and the senior tagma of the Scholai, while the Walls were associated with the Green faction and the second-most senior tagma, the Excubitors.

Like the other tagmata, the Domestic was assisted by a topotērētēs (τοποτηρητής, lit. "placeholder, lieutenant"), a secretary called chartoularios (χαρτουλάριος), and a chief messenger called prōtomandatōr (πρωτομανδάτωρ). The subaltern officers were titled, in late antique fashion, tribounoi (τριβοῦνοι, "tribunes") and vikarioi (βικάριοι, "vicarii"), corresponding to the komētēs ("counts") and kentarchoi ("centurions") of the other tagmata. There were also a number of messengers (μανδάτορες, mandatores) and door-keepers (πορτάριοι, portarioi), the latter evidently related to the regiment's prison guard duties.

== Sources ==
- Bury, John Bagnell (1911). The Imperial Administrative System of the Ninth Century - With a Revised Text of the Kletorologion of Philotheos. London: Oxford University Press.
- Guilland, Rodolphe (1969). Études de topographie de Constantinople byzantine, Tome I (in French). Berlin: Akademie-Verlag.
- Haldon, John F. (1984). Byzantine Praetorians: An Administrative, Institutional and Social Survey of the Opsikion and Tagmata, c. 580-900. Bonn: Rudolf Habelt. ISBN 3-7749-2004-4.
- Kazhdan, Alexander, ed. (1991). The Oxford Dictionary of Byzantium. Oxford and New York: Oxford University Press. ISBN 0-19-504652-8.
- Rance, Philip (2008). "Noumera or mounera: a parallel philological problem in De Cerimoniis and Maurice's Strategikon". Jahrbuch der Österreichischen Byzantinistik. 58: 121–129.
- Treadgold, Warren T. (1995). Byzantium and Its Army, 284-1081. Stanford University Press. ISBN 0-8047-3163-2.
