= Tagma (military) =

Military unit of the Byzantine Empire

The tagma (Greek: τάγμα; pl.: tagmata, τάγματα) is a military unit of battalion or regiment size, especially the elite regiments formed by Byzantine emperor Constantine V and comprising the central army of the Byzantine Empire in the 8th–11th centuries.

== History and role ==
In its original sense, the term "tagma" (from the Greek τάσσειν tássein, "to set in order") is attested from the 4th century and was used to refer to an infantry battalion of 200–400 men (also termed bandum or numerus in Latin, arithmos in Greek) in the contemporary Eastern Roman army. In this sense, the term continues in use in the current Hellenic Armed Forces (cf. Greek military ranks).

=== Imperial guards, 8th–10th centuries ===
In later usage, the term came to refer exclusively to the professional, standing troops, garrisoned in and around the capital of Constantinople. Most of them traced their origins to the Imperial guard units of the late antique Roman Empire. By the 7th century, these had declined to little more than parade troops, meaning that the emperors were hard put to face the frequent revolts of the new and powerful thematic formations, especially the Opsikion, the Asian theme closest to the capital. Within the first sixty years since its creation, it was involved in five revolts, culminating in the briefly successful rebellion and usurpation of the throne by its komēs (commander), Artabasdos, in 741–743.

After putting down the revolt, Emperor Constantine V (r. 741–775) reformed the old guard units of Constantinople into the new tagmata regiments, which were meant to provide the emperor with a core of professional and loyal troops, both as a defense against provincial revolts, and also, at the time, as a formation devoted to Constantine's iconoclastic policies. The tagmata were exclusively heavy cavalry units, more mobile than the theme troops, and maintained on a permanent basis. During the defensive phase of the Empire in the 8th and 9th centuries, their role was that of a central reserve, garrisoned in and around the capital, in regions such as Thrace and Bithynia. They formed the core of the imperial army on campaign, augmented by the provincial levies of thematic troops, who were more concerned with local defense.

In addition, like in Roman armies of late antiquity, they served as a recruiting and promotion ground for young officers. A career in a tagma could lead to a major command in the provincial thematic armies or a high court appointment, as promising young men had the opportunity to catch the Emperor's attention. Officers in the tagmata came primarily either from the relatively well-off urban aristocracy and officialdom, or the landed aristocracy of the Anatolian themes, which increasingly came to control the higher military offices of the state. Nevertheless, the tagmata, as indeed military and state service in general, offered a degree of upwards social mobility for the lower strata of society.

In their heyday in the 9th and early 10th centuries, there were four tagmata proper ("τὰ δʹ τάγματα"):

- the Scholai (Σχολαί "Schools"), were the most senior unit, the direct successor of the imperial guards established by Constantine the Great (r. 306–337). The term scholarioi (σχολάριοι), although in its stricter sense referring solely to the men of the Scholai, was also used as a general reference for all common soldiers of the tagmata.
- the Excubitors "Sentinels" (Lat. Excubiti, Gr. Ἐξκούβιτοι), established by Leo I.
- the Arithmos (Gr. Ἀριθμός, "Number") or Vigla (Βίγλα, from the Latin word for "Watch"), promoted from thematic troops by the Empress Eirene in the 780s, but of far older ancestry, as the archaic names of its ranks indicate. The regiment performed special duties on campaign, including guarding the imperial camp, relaying the Emperor's orders, and guarding prisoners of war.
- the Hikanatoi (Gr. Ἱκανάτοι, "Able Ones"), established by Emperor Nikephoros I (r. 802–811) in 810.

Other units closely related to the tagmata, and often included among them, were:

- the Noumeroi (Gr. Νούμεροι, from the Latin numerus, "number") were a garrison unit for Constantinople, which probably included the Teichistai (Gr. Τειχισταί) or tōn Teicheōn regiment (Gr. τῶν Τειχέων, "of the Walls"), manning the Walls of Constantinople. The unit's origins may lie as far back as the 4th–5th centuries.
- the Optimatoi (Gr. Ὀπτιμάτοι, from Latin optimates, "the Best"), although formerly an elite fighting unit, had by the 8th century been reduced to a support unit, responsible for the mules of the army's baggage train (the τοῦλδον touldon). Unlike the tagmata, it was garrisoned outside Constantinople and closely associated with its garrison area: the thema Optimatōn, which lay across Constantinople and comprised northern Bithynia. The commanding domestikos of the Optimatoi was also the governor of the thema.
- the men of the central Imperial Fleet (βασιλικόν πλώιμον basilikon plōimon), are also counted among the tagmata in some sources.
- the Immortals (Gr. Ἀθάνατοι), were one of the elite military units.
- the Archontopouloi (Gr. Ἀρχοντόπουλοι), were an elite military formation of the Komnenian era.

In addition, there was also the Hetaireia (Gr. Ἑταιρεία, "Companions"), which comprised the mercenary corps in Imperial service, subdivided in Greater, Middle and Lesser, each commanded by a respective Hetaireiarchēs.

==== Organization ====
There is much debate as to the exact size and composition of the imperial tagmata, owing to the inaccuracy and ambiguity of the few contemporary sources (military manuals, lists of offices and Arab accounts, primarily from the ninth century) that deal with them. Our primary sources, the accounts of Arab geographers ibn Khordadbeh and ibn Qudamah are somewhat ambiguous, but they give the overall tagmata strength at 24,000. This figure has been seen by many scholars, such as J. B. Bury and John Haldon, as too high, and revised estimates put the strength of each tagma at 1000–1500 men. Others, like Warren Treadgold and (in part) Friedhelm Winkelmann, accept these numbers, and correlate them with the lists of officers in the Klētorologion to reach an average size of 4000 for each tagma (including the Optimatoi and the Noumeroi, for which it is explicitly stated that they numbered 4000 each).

The tagmatic units were all organized along similar lines. They were commanded by a domestikos, except for the Vigla, which was commanded by the Droungarios of the Vigla. He was assisted by one or two officers called topotērētēs "place-warden, lieutenant" (τοποτηρητής), each of whom commanded one half of the unit. Unlike the thematic units, there were no permanent intermediate command levels (tourmarchai, chiliarchoi or pentakosiarchai) until Leo VI introduced the droungarios c. after 902. The largest subdivision of the tagmata was the bandon, commanded by a komēs "count", called skribōn in the Exkoubitores and tribounos "tribune" in the Noumeroi and Walls units. The banda in turn were divided in companies, headed by a kentarchos "centurion", or drakonarios for the Exkoubitores, and vikarios "vicar" for the Noumeroi and Walls units. The Domestic of the Schools, the head of the Scholai regiment, became gradually more and more important, eventually coming to be the most senior officer of the entire army by the end of the tenth century.

The following table illustrates the structure of the Scholai in the ninth century, according to Treadgold:

| Officer (No.) | Unit | Subordinates | Subdivisions |
|---|---|---|---|
| Domestikos (1) | Tagma | 4,000 | 20 banda |
| Topotērētēs (1/2) | | 2,000 | 10 banda |
| Komēs (20) | bandon | 200 | 5 kentarchiai |
| Kentarchos (40) | kentarchia | 40 |

In addition, there were a chartoularios "secretary" (χαρτουλάριος) and a prōtomandatōr "head messenger (πρωτομανδάτωρ), as well as 40 bandophoroi "standard bearers" (βανδοφόροι) of varying ranks and titles in each tagma, and 40 mandatores "messengers" for a total unit size of 4125. On campaign, every tagmatic cavalryman was accompanied by a servant.

The next table gives the evolution of the theoretical establishment size of the entire imperial tagmatic force, again as calculated by Warren Treadgold:

| Year | 745 | 810 | 842 | 959 | 970 | 976 | 1025 |
|---|---|---|---|---|---|---|---|
| Total size | 18,000 | 22,000 | 24,000 | 28,000 | 32,000 | 36,000 | 42,000 |

=== Professional regiments, 10th–11th centuries ===
As the Byzantine Empire embarked on its campaigns of reconquest in the 10th century, the tagmata became more active, and were posted often in garrison duties in the provinces or in newly conquered territories. In addition to the older units, a number of new and specialized units were formed to meet the demands of this more aggressive style of warfare. Michael II (r. 820–829) raised the short-lived Tessarakontarioi, a special marine unit (named after their high pay of 40 nomismata), and John I Tzimiskes (r. 969–976) created a heavy cataphract corps called the Athanatoi (Ἀθάνατοι, the "Immortals") after the ancient Achaemenid unit, which were revived in the late 11th century by Michael VII Doukas (r. 1071–1078). Other similar units were the Stratēlatai, likewise formed by John Tzimiskes, the short-lived Satrapai of the 970s, the Megathymoi of the 1040s or the Archontopouloi and Vestiaritai of Alexios I. Many of the new tagmata were composed of foreigners, such as the Maniakalatai, formed by George Maniakes from Franks in Italy, or the most famous of all tagmatic units, the 6,000-strong mercenary Varangian Guard (Τάγμα τῶν Βαραγγίων), established c. 988 by Emperor Basil II (r. 976–1025).

The reign of Basil II also saw the beginnings of a profound transformation of the Byzantine military system. In the mid-10th century, the decline in the numbers of the thematic forces and the exigencies of the new offensive strategy on the eastern border gave rise to an increasing number of provincial tagmata, permanent professional forces modelled after the imperial tagmata. The great conquests in the East in the 960s were secured by the creation of an array of smaller themata, in which detachments of these professional forces were based, eventually to be grouped under regional commanders with the title of doux or katepanō. This strategy was effective against small-scale local threats, but the concurrent neglect of the thematic forces reduced the state's ability to respond effectively to a major invasion that succeeded in penetrating the frontier buffer zone. The decline of the part-time thematic armies and the increasing reliance on a large array of permanent units, both indigenous and mercenary, was based not only on the greater military effectiveness of the latter in the more offensive Byzantine strategy of the era, but also on their greater reliability as opposed to the thematic troops with their local ties. The tagmata recruited from the larger themata were probably 1,000 men strong, while those from the smaller themata may have numbered c. 500 men. Foreign, chiefly Frankish mercenary units, also seem to have numbered 400–500 men.

Consequently, in the 11th century, the distinction between "imperial" and provincial forces largely vanished, and the term tagma was applied to any permanent formed regiment, and regional origins and identities are prominently displayed in the units' titles. After c. 1050, like the thematic armies, the original tagmata slowly declined, and were decimated in the military disasters of the latter third of the 11th century. Except for the Varangians, the Vestiaritai, the Hetaireia and the Vardariōtai, the older guard units disappear altogether by c. 1100 and are absent from the 12th-century Komnenian army. In the Komnenian army, the term tagma reverted to a non-specific meaning of "military unit".

== Notes ==
a: The main contemporary sources for the period from the 8th to the late 10th centuries are: i) the various lists of offices (Taktika), including the Taktikon Uspensky (c. 842), the Klētorologion of Philotheos (899), and the Escorial Taktikon (c. 975); ii) the various Byzantine military manuals, chiefly the Tactica of Leo VI the Wise; iii) the works of Arab geographers Ibn al-Faqīh, Ibn Khordadbeh and Qudāmah ibn Ja'far, who preserve the earlier work of al-Jarmī that dates to c. 840; and iv) the De Administrando Imperio and De Ceremoniis of Emperor Constantine VII.

== Sources ==
- Bury, J. B.; Philotheus (1911). The Imperial Administrative System of the Ninth Century (With a Revised Text of the Kletorologion of Philotheos). London: Oxford University Press.
- McCotter, Stephen: Byzantine army, edited by Richard Holmes, published in The Oxford Companion to Military History (Oxford University Press, 2001).
- Bartusis, Mark C. (1997). The Late Byzantine Army: Arms and Society 1204–1453. University of Pennsylvania Press. ISBN 0-8122-1620-2.
- Hélène, Glykatzi-Ahrweiler (1960). "Recherches sur l'administration de l'empire byzantin aux IX-XIème siècles". Bulletin de correspondance hellénique (in French). 84 (1): 1–111. doi:10.3406/bch.1960.1551.
- Haldon, John F. (1984). Byzantine Praetorians. An Administrative, Institutional and Social Survey of the Opsikion and Tagmata, c. 580-900. Bonn: Dr. Rudolf Habelt GmbH. ISBN 3-7749-2004-4.
- Haldon, John (1999). Warfare, State and Society in the Byzantine World, 565–1204. London: UCL Press. ISBN 1-85728-495-X.
- Haldon, John F. (1995). Mango, Cyril; Dagron, Gilbert (eds.). "Strategies of Defence, Problems of Security: the Garrisons of Constantinople in the Middle Byzantine Period". Constantinople and Its Hinterland: Papers from the Twenty-Seventh Spring Symposium of Byzantine Studies, Oxford, April 1993. Ashgate Publishing. Archived from the original on 2009-08-26.
- Kazhdan, Alexander, ed. (1991). The Oxford Dictionary of Byzantium. Oxford and New York: Oxford University Press. ISBN 0-19-504652-8.
- Kühn, Hans-Joachim (1991). Die byzantinische Armee im 10. und 11. Jahrhundert: Studien zur Organisation der Tagmata (in German). Vienna: Fassbaender Verlag. ISBN 3-9005-38-23-9.
- Treadgold, Warren T. (1995). Byzantium and Its Army, 284-1081. Stanford University Press. ISBN 0-8047-3163-2.
- Treadgold, Warren T.: Notes on the Numbers and Organisation of the Ninth-Century Byzantine Army, published in Greek, Roman and Byzantine Studies 21 (Oxford, 1980).
- Treadgold, Warren T.: The Struggle for Survival, edited by Cyril Mango, published in The Oxford History of Byzantium (Oxford University Press, 2002).
