= Domestikos =

Roman and Byzantine office

Domestikos (/doʊˈmɛstɪˌkɒs/; Greek: δομέστικος, from the Latin: domesticus, lit. 'of the household'), in English sometimes [the] Domestic, was a civil, ecclesiastic and military office in the Late Roman Empire and the Byzantine Empire.

== Military usage ==
The domestikoi trace their ancestry to the protectores domestici guard unit of the Late Roman army, established in the late 3rd century. These were a corps of men that served as a staff to the Roman emperors, while also functioning as an officer school. These continued in existence in the Eastern Roman/Byzantine Empire until the late 6th century. In the Byzantine army, the old protectores domestici had vanished by the 7th century, and the name only remained as a title associated with certain guard units. Following the creation of the tagmata in the mid-8th century, four of them, the Scholai, the Exkoubitoi, the Hikanatoi and the Noumeroi, as well as, uniquely, the thema of the Optimatoi, were led by a domestikos. To them was added the short-lived tagma of the Athanatoi in the late 10th century.

The most important among them, the domestikos tōn scholōn ("Domestic of the Schools") would by the 10th century rise to be the commander-in-chief of the army after the Emperor, and the post would later in the same century be divided in two, with the domestikoi of the East (tēs anatolēs) and of the West (tēs dyseōs) commanding the military forces in Asia Minor and Europe (the Balkans) respectively. In his capacity as the de facto commander-in-chief of the army, the domestikos tōn scholōn was replaced by the megas domestikos ("Grand Domestic") in the 12th–13th centuries, while the ordinary domestikos became an honorary title awarded to mid-level officials during the Palaiologan period. The megas domestikos remained the commander-in-chief of the Byzantine army thereafter until the end of the Byzantine Empire. In the Komnenian period, in an echo of the 10th-century arrangements, the megas domestikos would sometimes command the entire field army of East or West, but in the Palaiologan period, there was only one holder of the office, who came to be one of the senior-most courtiers, ranking directly after the Caesar.

== Civil and palace functionaries ==
From 355, civil domestici are also attested at the head of various bureaus, and various high administrative positions remained associated with the title domestikos until the late Byzantine Empire. Some court positions were also renamed, as their departments became independent: the domestikos tēs basilikēs trapezēs ("domestic of the imperial table") attested in 680 derives from the old castrensis palatii.

== Ecclesiastic usage ==
In an ecclesiastical context, a domestikos was the head of a group associated with church ritual, especially in reference to choir singers. They were the choirmasters, leading the singing and the acclamations of the Emperor and the patriarch.

== Sources ==
- Haldon, John F. (1997). Byzantium in the Seventh Century: The Transformation of a Culture. Cambridge: Cambridge University Press. ISBN 978-0-521-31917-1.
- Kazhdan, Alexander, ed. (1991). The Oxford Dictionary of Byzantium. Oxford and New York: Oxford University Press. ISBN 0-19-504652-8.
- Moran, Neil K. (1986). Singers in Late Byzantine and Slavonic Painting. Leiden: E. J. Brill. ISBN 978-90-04-07809-3.
- Southern, Pat; Dixon, Karen R. (1996). The Late Roman Army. New Haven, Connecticut: Yale University Press. ISBN 0-300-06843-3.
- Treadgold, Warren T. (1995). Byzantium and Its Army, 284–1081. Stanford, California: Stanford University Press. ISBN 0-8047-3163-2.
