= Mandator =

The mandatōr (Greek: μανδάτωρ), deriving from the Latin word for "messenger", was a subaltern official in the middle Byzantine Empire.

== History and functions ==
The mandatores were a corps of messengers for special duties attached to the bureaux of all senior civil and military officials, such as the thematic stratēgoi, the commanders of the tagmata, the logothetes and others. They were then headed by a prōtomandatōr (πρωτομανδάτωρ, "first mandatōr"), a mid-level official.

These officials must be distinguished from the honorary dignity of basilikos mandatōr (βασιλικὸς μανδάτωρ, "imperial mandatōr"), which was one of the lower court titles (fourth from the bottom, between the vestētōr and the kandidatos) intended for "bearded men" (i.e. non-eunuchs). According to the Klētorologion of 899, its insigne was a red wand. Together with the other lower rank classes, the basilikoi mandatores were designated as the basilikoi anthrōpoi ("the emperor's men"), and headed collectively by a dedicated official with the title of prōtospatharios tōn basilikōn.

Both the simple mandatores and the basilikoi mandatores, as well as the prōtomandatores, are attested in the 7th–11th centuries. They seem to have disappeared thereafter. The French Byzantinist Rodolphe Guilland suggested that they were replaced by the tzaousioi. The term itself survived however in Georgia, where "მანდატური" (mandaturi) serves as a term for security forces serving in Parliament, courts as well as public schools.

== Sources ==
- Bury, J. B. (1911). The Imperial Administrative System of the Ninth Century – With a Revised Text of the Kletorologion of Philotheos. London: Oxford University Press. OCLC 1046639111.
- Guilland, Rodolphe (1967). Recherches sur les institutions byzantines [Studies on the Byzantine Institutions]. Berliner byzantinische Arbeiten 35 (in French). Vol. I. Berlin and Amsterdam: Akademie-Verlag & Adolf M. Hakkert. OCLC 878894516.
- Kazhdan, Alexander, ed. (1991). The Oxford Dictionary of Byzantium. Oxford and New York: Oxford University Press. ISBN 0-19-504652-8.
