= Numerus (Roman military unit) =

A numerus (lit. 'number', plural numeri) was a unit of the Roman army.

In the Imperial Roman army (27 BC – 476 AD), it referred to units of barbarian allies who were not integrated into the regular army structure of legions and auxilia. Such units were of undetermined strength and their organisation and equipment probably varied according to the unit's ethnic origin. The term was also applied to quasi-permanent detachments of regular army units.

In the Late Roman army (284 – 476), a numerus was a regular infantry unit of the limitanei, or border forces, believed to have been c. 300 strong.

== See also ==
- Foederati
- Noumeroi
