= Protospatharios =

Byzantine court title

Prōtospatharios (Greek: πρωτοσπαθάριος) was one of the highest court dignities of the middle Byzantine period (8th to 12th centuries), awarded to senior generals and provincial governors, as well as to foreign princes.

== History ==
The meaning of the title, "first spatharios", indicates its original role as leader of the order (taxis) of the spatharioi, the imperial bodyguards, was already attested in the 6th century. Probably under the Heraclians, the rank became an honorary dignity (Greek: δια βραβείου ἀξία, dia brabeiou axia), and was henceforth bestowed to high-ranking theme commanders, senior court officials, and allied rulers. The first concrete reference to a prōtospatharios occurs in the Chronicle of Theophanes the Confessor, who records "Sergios, prōtospatharios and stratēgos of Sicily" in 718. In the late 9th century, the prōtospatharios is recorded as ranking below the patrikios and above the dishypatos. The award of the dignity also meant the entry of its holder in the Byzantine Senate. Its prestige was consequently very high, as illustrated by a well-known story related by Emperor Constantine Porphyrogennetos (r. 913–959) in his De Administrando Imperio: during the reign of his father, Emperor Leo VI the Wise (r. 886–912), an aged cleric of the Nea Ekklesia, Ktenas by name, paid 60 litras of gold (circa 19.4 kg), i.e. sixty times the annual stipend of 72 nomismata to which prōtospatharioi were entitled, to acquire the title. He did not live long to enjoy his new status, however, dying two years later. Like other titles of the middle Byzantine period, its importance declined sharply in the 11th century. The last attested occurrence is in 1115, although the title is still recorded by pseudo-Kodinos in the mid-14th century in the 34th place of the court hierarchy, between the primmikerios of the court and the megas archōn.

According to the Klētorologion of Philotheos, the holders of the dignity were distinguished between eunuchs (ektomiai) and non-eunuchs (barbatoi, "bearded ones"). In addition to the insigne of their rank, a gold necklet (maniakion) adorned with pearls, the former had a special dress, a white, gold-adorned tunic and a red doublet with gold facings. The non-eunuchs were distinguished only by their golden collar (kloios), decorated with precious stones. Pictorial evidence of the dress of prōtospatharioi in illuminated manuscripts, however, varies considerably over time. In the Book of Offices of pseudo-Kodinos, the garb of this rank is defined as a gold wire-embroidered skaranikon (a tubular headdress), with the image of the reigning emperor enthroned in front and riding a horse behind, a gold kabbadion (caftan) and a skiadion (brimmed hat) of the klapōton type, while bearing no distinctive dikanikion (staff of office).

In the Empire of Trebizond, an equivalent title of Turkish origin, amytzantarios, was used.

== Functions ==
Aside from being a court rank, there were several prōtospatharioi who had specific duties:

- The prōtospatharios in charge of the Chrysotriklinos (πρωτοσπαθάριος τοῦ Χρυσοτρικλίνου), the main reception hall of the Great Palace.
- The prōtospatharios in charge of the Lausiakos (πρωτοσπαθάριος τοῦ Λαυσιακοῦ), one of the main halls adjacent to the Chrysotriklinos, serving as a meeting hall. The personnel (oikeiakoi) of the Lausiakos most likely also had functions related to the preparation of imperial banquets.
- The prōtospatharios, or katepanō, of the basilikoi anthrōpoi (πρωτοσπαθάριος/κατεπάνω τῶν βασιλικῶν), a corps of low-level imperial servants, including foreigners. He is listed as one of the stratarchai, thereby denoting an unspecified military role. His subordinate staff included lower-ranking officials (those of spatharioi and kandidatoi rank), with a domestikos as chief aide.

- The prōtospatharios tēs Phialēs (πρωτοσπαθάριος τῆς Φιάλης), an official acting as judge for the oarsmen of the Byzantine navy stationed around the capital, Constantinople. Like the exact functions of the office, the term phialē ("water-basin") is obscure; it could possibly refer to a location in the harbour of the imperial palace of Boukoleon.

== Notable foreign prōtospatharioi ==
- Ivan the Russian
- Mihailo I Vojislavljević of Duklja

== Sources ==
- Bury, J. B. (1911). The Imperial Administrative System of the Ninth Century – With a Revised Text of the Kletorologion of Philotheos. London: Oxford University Press. OCLC 1046639111.
- Kazhdan, Alexander, ed. (1991). The Oxford Dictionary of Byzantium. Oxford and New York: Oxford University Press. ISBN 0-19-504652-8.
- Neville, Leonora Alice (2004). Authority in Byzantine Provincial Society, 950-1100. Cambridge: Cambridge University Press. ISBN 978-0-521-83865-8.
- Verpeaux, Jean, ed. (1966). Pseudo-Kodinos, Traité des Offices (in French). Paris: Centre National de la Recherche Scientifique.
