= Topoteretes =

Byzantine offices

Topoteretes (Ancient Greek: τοποτηρητής, romanized: topotērētēs) was a Byzantine technical term, meaning deputy or lieutenant (lit. 'place-warden'). As such, it was used in different ways throughout the Empire's history. In the 9th-11th centuries, the topoteretes was the deputy of senior military commanders of the themata, the tagmata and the Byzantine navy. The topoteretes was usually placed in command of one half of the respective unit. In the early 12th century, topoteretai are found as commanders of small regions and fortresses, while in the late Palaiologan period, the term was used for representatives of the Patriarch of Constantinople in sees that now lay outside the Byzantine Empire's borders.

== Literature ==
- Cheynet, Jean-Claude (1984). "Toparque et topotèrètès à la fin du 11e siècle" [Toparches and Topoteretes at the End of the 11th Century]. Revue des Études Byzantines [Journal of Byzantine Studies] (in French) (42). Paris: 215–218.
