= Scholae Palatinae =

Late Roman and Byzantine-Era Imperial Guard Units

- Scholar Palatinae; Σχολαί
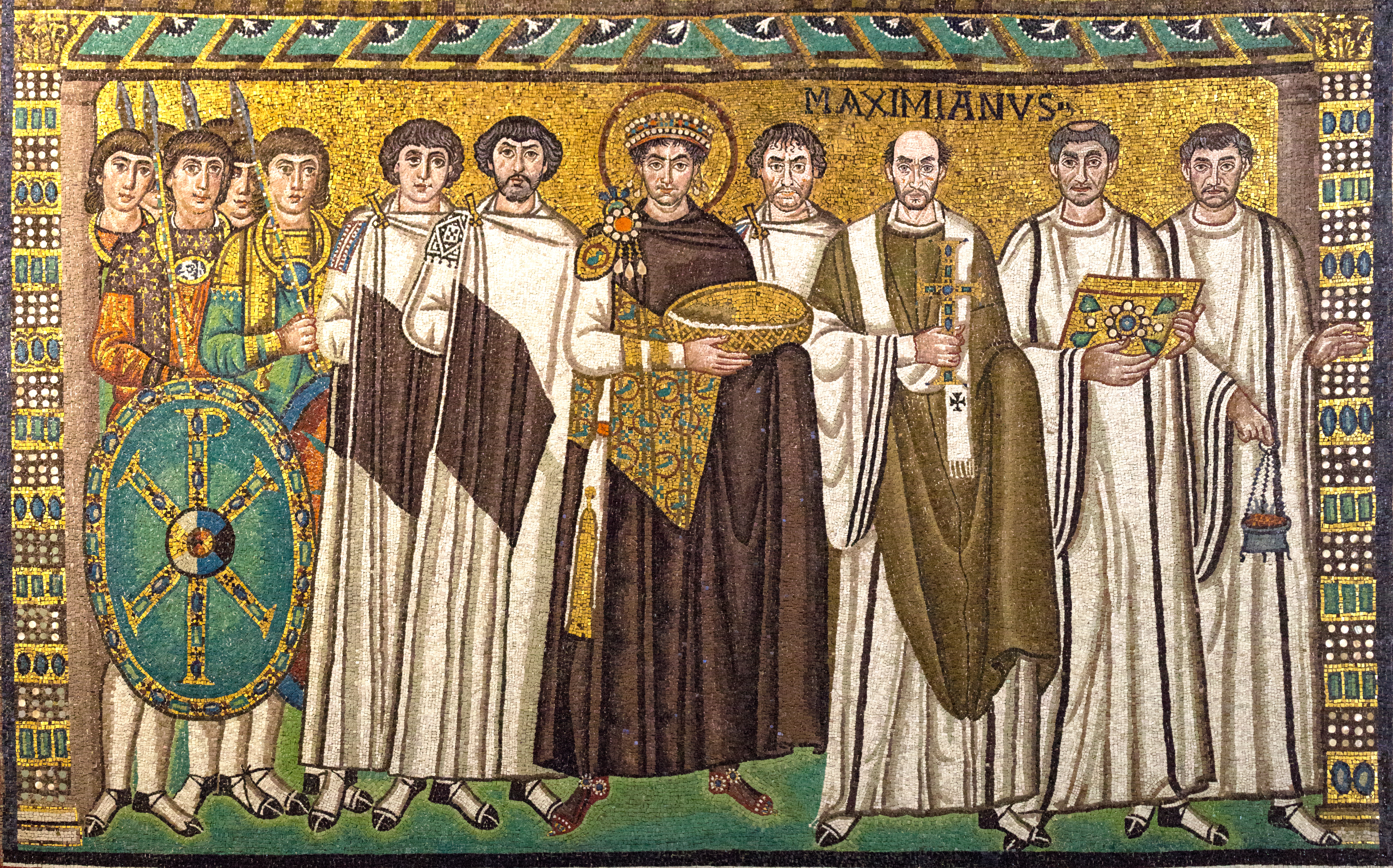
- Emperor Justinian I and his court, from the Basilica of San Vitale in Ravenna. The soldiers left, with the golden neck-torques typical of Byzantine guardsmen, are scholares.
- Active: 312 – c. 1068/9
- Allegiance: Roman Empire/Byzantine Empire
- Branch: Byzantine army Roman army
- Type: Imperial guard
- Role: Cavalry tactics Charge; Executive protection Force protection Hand-to-hand combat Maneuver warfare Raiding; Reconnaissance; Shock tactics

The Scholae Palatinae (lit. 'Palatine Schools'; Greek: Σχολαί, romanized: Scholai) were an elite military imperial guard unit, usually ascribed to the Roman Emperor Constantine the Great as a replacement for the equites singulares Augusti, the cavalry arm of the Praetorian Guard. The Scholae survived in Roman and later Byzantine service until they disappeared from the historical record in the late 11th century, during the reign of Alexios I Komnenos.

== 4th–7th centuries: imperial guards ==
=== History and structure ===
During the early 4th century, Caesar Severus II attempted to disband the remaining units of the Praetorian Guard on the orders of Galerius. In response, the Praetorians turned to Maxentius, the son of the retired emperor Maximian, and proclaimed him their emperor on 28 October 306. When Constantine the Great (r. 306–337), launching an invasion of Italy in 312, forced a final confrontation at the Milvian Bridge, the Praetorian cohorts made up the most prominent element of Maxentius' army. Later, in Rome, the victorious Constantine definitively disbanded the Praetorian Guard. Although there is no direct evidence that Constantine established the Scholae Palatinae at the same time, the lack of a bodyguard unit would have become immediately apparent, and he is commonly regarded as their founder. Nevertheless, some units, such as the schola gentilium ("school of tribesmen") are attested much earlier than 312, and may have their origins in the reign of Diocletian (r. 284–305).

The term "schola" was commonly used in the early 4th century to refer to organized corps of the imperial retinue, both civil and military, and derives from the fact that they occupied specific rooms or chambers in the palace. Each schola was formed into an elite cavalry regiment of around 500 troops. (Note: Number attested in the time of Justinian *Codex Justinianeus IV.65 & XXXV.1); 4th-century numbers may have been different.) Many scholarians (Latin: scholares, Greek: σχολάριοι, scholarioi) were recruited from among Germanic tribes. In the West, these were Franks and Alamanni, while in the East, Goths were employed. In the East, under the impact of anti-Gothic policies, from the mid-5th century they were largely replaced with Armenians and Isaurians. However, evidence of the scholarians mentioned in primary sources indicates that the presence of native Romans in the scholae was not negligible. Of the recorded and named scholarians in the fourth century, ten are definitely Roman, forty one probably Roman; whilst only five are definitely barbarian and eleven probably barbarian.

Each schola was commanded by a tribunus who ranked as a comes of the first class, and who were discharged with a rank equal to that of a provincial dux. The tribunus had a number of senior officers called domestici or protectores directly under him. Unlike the Praetorians, there was no overall military commander of the scholae, and the Emperor retained direct control over them; however, for administrative purposes, the scholae were eventually placed under the direction of the magister officiorum. In the Notitia Dignitatum of the late 4th century, seven scholae are listed for the Eastern Empire and five for the Western. In Justinian I's time (r. 527–565), but also possibly in earlier times, the scholae were billeted in the wider neighbourhood of Constantinople, in the towns of Bithynia and Thrace, serving in the palace by rotation.

As befitted their guards status, the scholarians received higher pay and enjoyed more privileges than the regular army: they received extra rations (annonae civicae), were exempt from the recruitment tax (privilegiis scholarum) and were often used by the Emperors on civilian missions inside the Empire. Gradually however, the ease of palace life and lack of actual campaigning, as the Emperors ceased to take the field themselves, lessened their combat abilities. In the East, they were eventually replaced as the main imperial bodyguard by the Excubitors, founded by Emperor Leo I the Thracian (r. 457–474), while in the West, they were permanently disbanded by the Ostrogoth ruler Theodoric the Great (ruler of Italy in 493–526). Under Emperor Zeno (r. 474–491), they degenerated to parade-ground display troops: as it became possible to buy an appointment into the ranks of the scholae, and the social status and benefits this entailed, the units were increasingly filled with by the capital's well-connected young nobility. Emperor Justinian is said to have caused panic amongst their members by proposing that they be sent on an expedition. Justinian also raised four "supernumerary" scholae of 2,000 men purely in order to raise money from the sale of the appointments. It seems that this increase was reverted by the same emperor later.

Forty scholares, named candidati for their bright white tunics, were selected to form the Emperor's personal bodyguard, and although by the 6th century they too fulfilled a purely ceremonial role, in the 4th century they accompanied the emperors on campaign, as for example Julian (r. 361–363) in Persia.

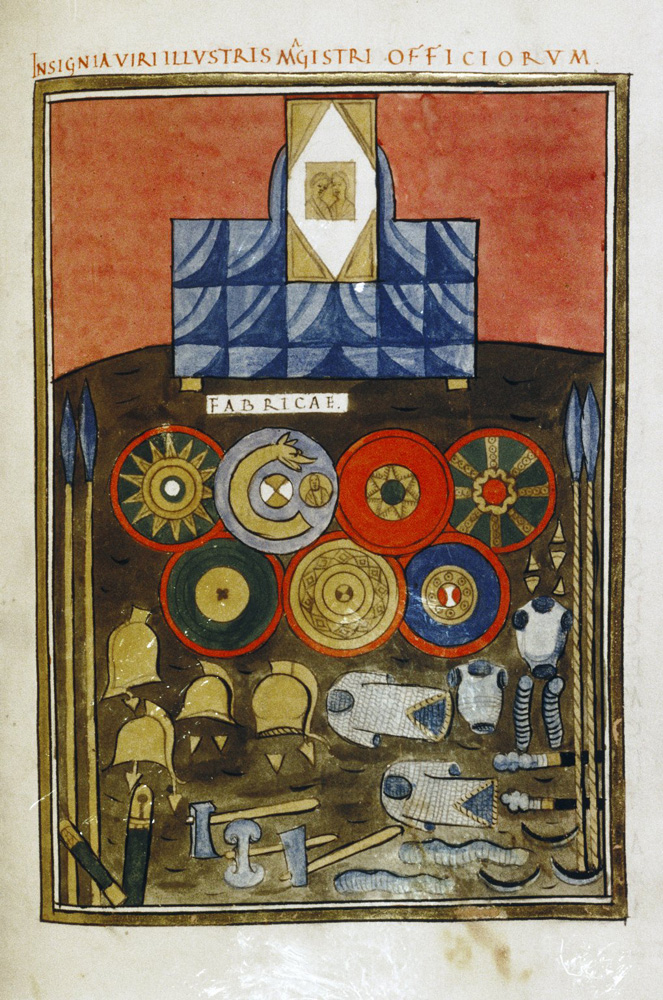
The insignia of the Western scholae, from the Notitia Dignitatum.

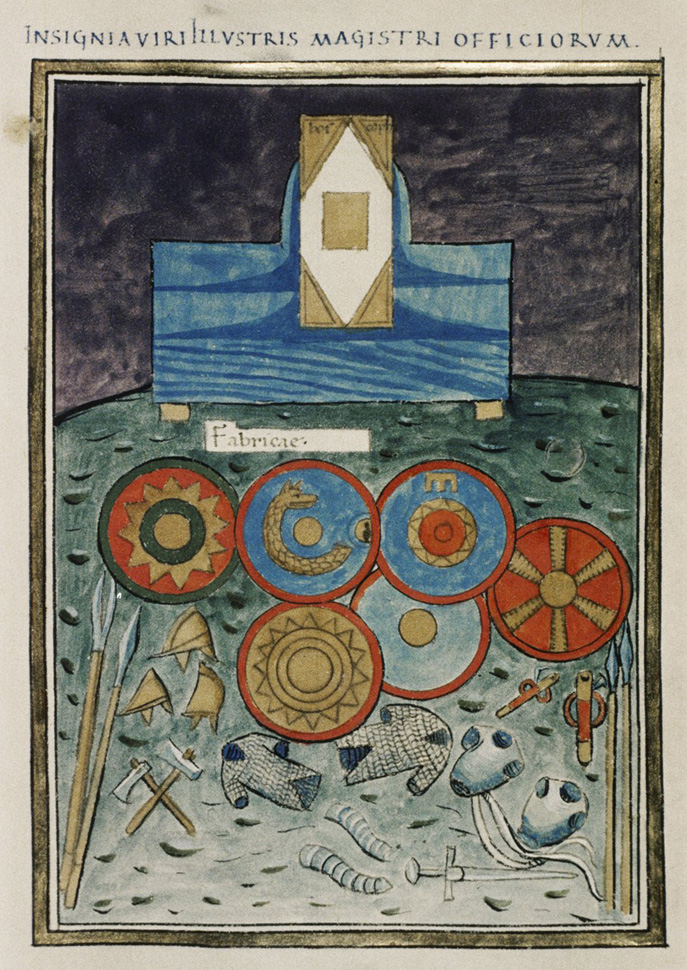
The insignia of the Eastern scholae, from the Notitia Dignitatum.

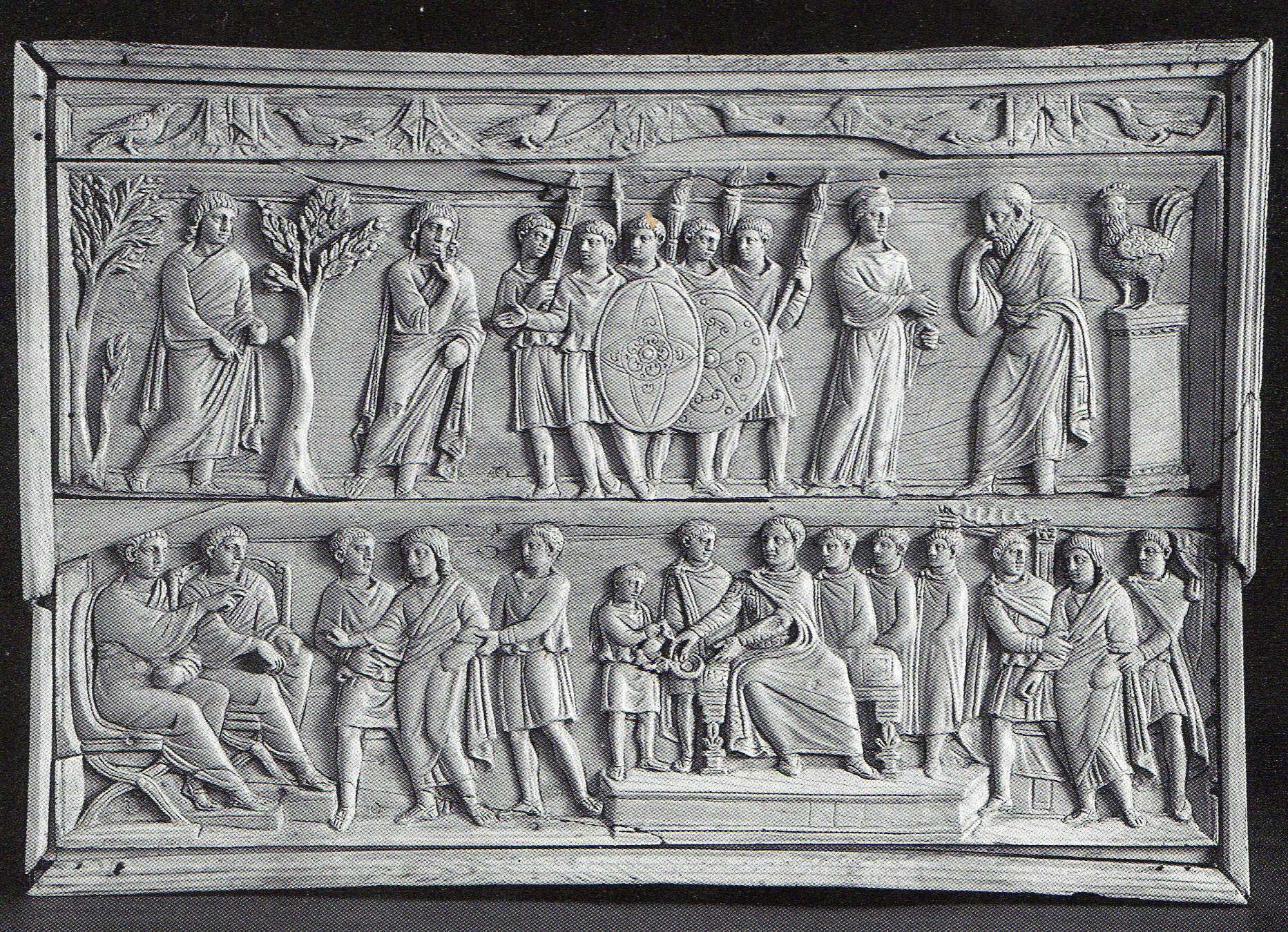
Palatine insignia on the shields of the soldiers in the Arrest of Christ on the Brescia Casket, late 4th century.

=== List of scholae from the Notitia Dignitatum ===
In the Western Empire (the Western part of the Notitia refers to the 420s):

- Scola scutariorum prima
- Scola scutariorum secunda
- Scola armaturarum seniorum
- Scola gentilium seniorum
- Scola scutatorum tertia

In the Eastern Empire (the Eastern part of the Notitia refers to the 390s):

- Scola scutariorum prima
- Scola scutariorum secunda
- Scola gentilium seniorum (Note: Most likely the same unit mentioned for the West, transferred there after the Eastern list was compiled)
- Scola scutariorum sagittariorum, a unit of horse archers.
- Scola scutariorum clibanariorum, a unit of clibanarii.
- Scola armaturarum iuniorum
- Scola gentilium iuniorum

Note: The suffixes "seniorum" and "iuniorum" refer to units of the same ancestry, now commonly held to have been created from the division of the Roman army in 364 between emperors Valens and Valentinian I. The seniores are the "senior" Western units, while iuniores their "junior" Eastern counterparts.

=== Notable scholarians ===
- Saints Sergius and Bacchus were officers in Emperor Maximian's schola gentilium.
- Saint Martin of Tours, an officer in the scholae of Caesar Julian.
- Mallobaudes, a Frankish king, tribunus armaturarum, later magister militum.
- Claudius Silvanus, a Frankish tribune and later usurper.
- Bacurius, prince of Caucasian Iberia, tribunus sagittariorum at the Battle of Adrianople.
- Cassio, tribunus scutariorum (likely of the elite first schola) at the Battle of Adrianople.
- Justinian I served as a candidatus in 518, at the time of the death of Emperor Anastasius and the accession of his uncle Justin I.

== 8th–11th centuries: the scholae as one of the tagmata ==
The scholae, along with the excubitores, continued to exist in the 7th and early 8th centuries, although diminished in size, as purely ceremonial units. However, in ca. 743, after putting down a major rebellion of thematic troops, Emperor Constantine V (r. 741–775) reformed the old guard units of Constantinople into the new tagmata regiments, which were meant to provide the emperor with a core of professional and loyal troops. The tagmata were professional heavy cavalry units, garrisoned in and around Constantinople, forming the central reserve of the Byzantine military system and the core of the imperial expeditionary forces. In addition, like their Late Roman ancestors, they were an important stage in a military career for young aristocrats, which could lead to major field commands or state offices.

The exact size of the tagmata is a subject of debate. Estimates range from 1,000 to 4,000 men. The various tagmata had a uniform structure, differing only in the nomenclature used for certain titles, which reflected their different ancestries. The scholai were headed by the domestikos tōn scholōn (δομέστικος τῶν σχολῶν, "Domestic of the Schools"), first attested in 767. As the old office of the magister officiorum was transformed into the more or less ceremonial post of magistros, the domestikos was established as the independent commander of the scholai. In contemporary records, he holds the rank of patrikios, and is considered one of the most senior generals in status, surpassed only by the strategos of the Anatolic Theme. By the 10th century, he had risen to be the senior officer of the entire army, thus a commander-in-chief under the Emperor in effect. In ca. 959, the post and the unit itself were divided into two separate commands, one for the East (domestikos [tōn scholōn tēs] anatolēs) and one for the West (domestikos [tōn scholōn tēs] dyseōs).

The domestikos tōn scholōn was assisted by two officers called topotērētēs (τοποτηρητής, lit. "placeholder", "lieutenant"), who each commanded half of the unit, a chartoularios (χαρτουλάριος, "secretary") and the proexēmos or proximos (head messenger). The tagma was further divided into smaller units (banda, sing. bandon) commanded by a komēs (κόμης [τῶν σχολῶν], "Count [of the Schools]"). In the late 10th century, there were 30 such banda, of unknown size. Each komēs commanded 5 junior domestikoi, the equivalent of regular army kentarchoi ("centurions"). There were also 40 standard-bearers (bandophoroi), who were grouped in four different categories. In the scholai, these were: protiktores (προτίκτορες, "protectors", deriving from the older protectores), eutychophoroi (εὐτυχοφόροι, "carriers of eutychia"; here eutychia is a corruption of ptychia, images of Fortune and Victory), skēptrophoroi ("bearers of sceptres", i.e. staves with images on top) and axiōmatikoi ("officers"). (Note: For a list of the attested subaltern officers of the scholai in the 8th–10th centuries, cf.)

The kandidatoi are still mentioned in the 10th-century work De Ceremoniis, but the title had become nothing more than a palace dignity, fulfilling a purely ceremonial role and entirely separate from the tagma of the scholai.

The regiment of the scholai is attested for the last time in 1068/9, under Emperor Romanos IV Diogenes (r. 1068–1071), in combat around Aleppo.

== 9th-10th centuries: the schola among the Franks ==
This Roman tradition was also revived among the Franks during the reign of Charlemagne, who named his elite royal guards schola, based on the scholae palatinae. This tradition remained alive during the Carolingian period, but afterwards it fell out of use, and the term disappeared from Frankish military terminology.

== Bibliography ==
- Elton, Hugh (1996). Warfare in Roman Europe, AD 350–425. Oxford University Press. ISBN 978-0-19-815241-5.
- Frank, R.I. (1969). Scholae Palatinae. The Palace Guards of the Later Roman Empire Rome.
- Haldon, John (1999). Warfare, State and Society in the Byzantine World, 565–1204. London: UCL Press. ISBN 1-85728-495-X.
- Haldon, John F.: Strategies of Defence, Problems of Security: the Garrisons of Constantinople in the Middle Byzantine Period, published in Constantinople and its Hinterland: Papers from the Twenty-Seventh Spring Symposium of Byzantine Studies, Oxford, April 1993, edited by Cyril Mango and Gilbert Dagron (Aldershot: Ashgate, 1995)
- Kühn, Hans-Joachim (1991). Die byzantinische Armee im 10. und 11. Jahrhundert: Studien zur Organisation der Tagmata (in German). Vienna: Fassbaender Verlag. ISBN 3-9005-38-23-9.
- Southern, Pat; Dixon, Karen R. (1996). The Late Roman Army. Routledge. ISBN 0-7134-7047-X.
- Jones, Arnold Hugh Martin (1986). The Later Roman Empire, 284-602: A Social Economic and Administrative Survey. Johns Hopkins University Press. ISBN 0-8018-3354-X.
- Treadgold, Warren T.: Notes on the Numbers and Organisation of the Ninth-Century Byzantine Army, published in Greek, Roman and Byzantine Studies 21 (Oxford, 1980)
- Treadgold, Warren T. (1995). Byzantium and Its Army, 284-1081. Stanford University Press. ISBN 0-8047-3163-2.
