= Kletorologion =

The Klētorologion of Philotheos (Greek: Κλητορολόγιον) is the longest and most important of the Byzantine lists of offices and court precedence (Taktika). It was published in September 899 during the reign of Emperor Leo VI the Wise (r. 886–912) by the otherwise unknown prōtospatharios and atriklinēs Philotheos. As atriklinēs, Philotheos would have been responsible for receiving the guests for the imperial banquets (klētοria) and for conducting them to their proper seating places according to their place in the imperial hierarchy. In the preface to his work, he explicitly states that he compiled this treatise as a "precise exposé of the order of imperial banquets, of the name and value of each title, complied on the basis of ancient klētοrologia", and recommends its adoption at the imperial table.

== Sections ==
Philotheos's work survives only as an appendix within the last chapters (52–54) of the second book of a later treatise on imperial ceremonies known as the De Ceremoniis of Emperor Constantine Porphyrogennetos (r. 913–959). It is divided into four sections:

- Section I is the introductory, and gives a brief overview of all the court ranks and state offices of the Byzantine Empire, which it divides into five categories: orders of rank for "bearded men" (i.e. non-eunuchs), great offices of the state, minor offices of the various bureaus and ministries, orders of rank for eunuchs, and great offices of the state reserved for eunuchs.
- Sections II and III give the order in which officials should be introduced to the imperial banquets. Section II gives the highest dignitaries, those who could be seated at the Byzantine emperor's own table, while Section III deals with middle-ranking and lower-ranking officials, as well as with the embassies from the other patriarchates (Rome, Antioch and Jerusalem) and foreign embassies (Arabs, Bulgars and Germans).
- Section IV is the longest portion of the text, and is addressed to the court atriklinēs giving advice on arranging the various banquets throughout the year, beginning with the celebrations for Christmas. It also contains two attached memoranda, one on the largesses doled out by the Byzantine emperor to officials on certain occasions, and the other on the salaries of the atriklinai officials.
- A short appendix follows (chapter 54 of the De Ceremoniis) with the various ecclesiastic officials and their precedence, as well as the Notitia Episcopatuum of pseudo-Epiphanius, a list of episcopal sees.

== Sources ==
- Bury, J. B.; Philotheus (1911). The Imperial Administrative System of the Ninth Century (With a Revised Text of the Kletorologion of Philotheos). London: Oxford University Press.
- Kazhdan, Alexander (1991). "Philotheos, Kletorologion of". In Kazhdan, Alexander (ed.). The Oxford Dictionary of Byzantium. Oxford and New York: Oxford University Press. pp. 1661–1662. ISBN 0-19-504652-8.
