= Constantine (son of Basil I) =

Byzantine emperor from 868 to 879

- Emperor of the Romans
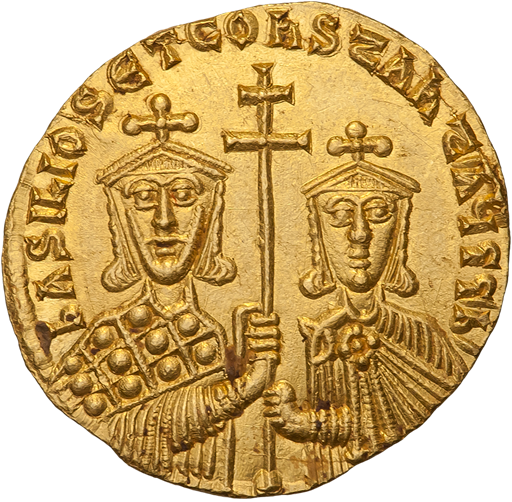
- Constantine (right) with Emperor Basil (left)

Byzantine co-emperor
- Reign: c. January 868 – 3 September 879
- Predecessor: Basil I (alone)
- Successor: Basil I and Leo VI
- Born: Between 855 and c. 865
- Died: 3 September 879
- Betrothed: Ermengard of Italy
- Dynasty: Macedonian dynasty
- Father: Basil I, possibly Michael III
- Mother: Maria, possibly Eudokia Ingerina

Constantine (Ancient Greek: Κωνσταντῖνος, romanized: Kōnstantīnos; born between 855 and c. 865, died 3 September 879) was a junior Byzantine emperor, alongside Basil I as the senior emperor, from January 868 to 3 September 879. His parentage is a matter of debate, but historians generally assume him to be the son of Emperor Basil I (r. 867–886) and his first wife Maria or second wife Eudokia Ingerina; other theories include him being the son of Emperor Michael III (r. 842–867) and Eudokia. Constantine was made co-emperor by Basil in c. January 868. He was engaged to Ermengard of Italy, the daughter of Holy Roman Emperor Louis II, in 870/871, but it is not known if he married her; some sources suggest he did, and others argue that there is no concrete evidence.

Constantine was the intended heir of Basil and as such received much attention from him and accompanied him on military campaigns, including one in Syria, for which he shared a triumph. In comparison, his younger brother, Leo VI (r. 886–912), was made co-emperor merely to secure the imperial lineage and bolster legitimacy. However, Constantine died of fever on 3 September 879, before his father. After his death, Leo became the primary heir, and another brother, Alexander (r. 912–913), was raised to co-emperor.

== Life ==
=== Parentage ===
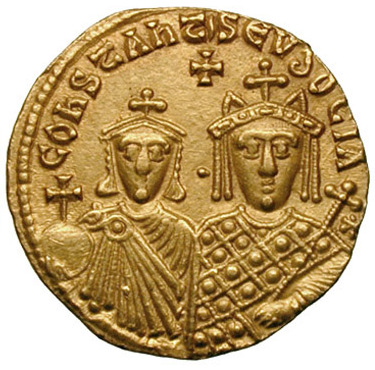
The reverse of a coin bearing the image of Constantine and Eudokia

According to Nicholas Adontz, Constantine was born c. 855, although the historian Shaun Tougher posits a birthdate of 864 or after. Constantine's parentage is heavily disputed, but Byzantine emperor Basil I (r. 867–886) was nominally his father. Basil had been born into a well-off peasant family, before gaining the notice of Emperor Michael III (r. 842–867), and subsequently became his confidant and Parakoimomenos (chief minister). Sources state that Basil had been married to Maria before he became emperor, and produced at least one child, Anastasia, and possibly Constantine himself, before being ordered by Michael III to divorce her and marry Eudokia Ingerina (r. 866–882), which he did. Eudokia is reported by some sources to have been the mistress of Michael III, and to have remained so even after marrying Basil. The exact date of the wedding is unknown, but the marriage of Basil to Eudokia has been traditionally dated to c. 865, based upon the timeline of the 10th-century Pseudo-Symeon; although historians such as Romilly Jenkins and Patricia Karlin-Hayter have questioned the validity of this timeline. Jenkins also points to the "chronological incongruities" of Symeon Logothete's narrative of Michael's reign, casting further doubt on the marriage date of Basil and Eudokia. Cyril Mango contends that Constantine was the child of Basil and Maria, along with Anastasia, a view shared by George Ostrogorsky. The British byzantinist Judith Herrin posits a different date for the marriage of Basil and Eudokia, which would make Eudokia the mother of Constantine. Leo Grammaticus, a 10th-century historian, suggests that Constantine was the son of Michael and Eudokia. The historians Lynda Garland and Shaun Tougher do not take a position in their 2007 work but admit that any of the three are possible.

Some sources hostile to the Macedonian dynasty, which was founded by Basil, have suggested that other sons of Basil were not his own. These sources claim that Eudokia was Michael's mistress, and that the marriage between Basil and Eudokia was intended to be in name only. Accordingly, the parentage of both Leo VI (r. 886–912) and Stephen I of Constantinople, has been questioned, leaving Alexander (r. 912–913) as Basil's only legitimate son. Most modern scholars doubt the accuracy of such claims, considering Leo as the legitimate son of Basil and Eudokia.

In his 1994 Ph.D. thesis, Tougher supports the theory that Constantine was the son of Eudokia. In his later 1997 work, he debates much of the reasoning behind considering Constantine to be Maria's son, and states that "there is no reason to believe that he was not a son of Eudokia", but does not definitively identify a mother for Constantine. In his 1994 work, he points out that many Byzantine chroniclers consider Constantine to be the son of Basil, and that many historians use an argument that Constantine was Maria's son as a way to explain why Leo, but not Constantine, was said to be hated by Basil, as Basil would therefore consider Constantine his true son. He also posits that Alexander, who could not possibly be Michael's son, by virtue of being born after his death, was not elevated in place of Constantine and Leo, suggesting that either Basil believed them both to be his own sons, or else was not bothered by them not being such, and that Michael does not seem to have viewed Leo in any paternal way. Tougher questions the arguments that preclude Constantine from being the son of Eudokia, by arguing that if he was born after the marriage of Eudokia and Basil, he would have been too young to campaign with his father in 878; he states that, given the issues related to the chronology of the marriage of Basil and Eudokia, it is possible that Constantine would be of fighting age. Arnold J. Toynbee puts forth the argument that parents may have different feelings for sons, and the difference of personality is as likely as different mothers to explain why Basil preferred Constantine to Leo.

In his 1997 work, Tougher points out that Mango's reconstruction is ingenious, but convoluted, arguing that Michael could simply have adopted Constantine, rather than enacting a conspiracy to have his child, whom he could not have known would be male, born in the purple. This is reinforced by the fact that Alexander was only made emperor in 879, after Constantine's death. Tougher also points out that Leo VI advocated bringing the son of noblemen, called "noble whelps", on campaigns in his Tactica, the same term that the Life of Basil uses for Constantine in its narrative of the 878 campaign; Constantine may have been 13/14 at the time, and therefore it is possible he was the son of Eudokia. Adontz's contention that Constantine must have been born around 855, and therefore the son of Maria, is based on Contantine's engagement to Ermengard of Italy, the daughter of Holy Roman Emperor Louis II (r. 844–875); Tougher considers that this was more of a child's engagement than a true marriage and that, given that many Byzantine men were married at age 15, this may point to him being younger.

Pro-Macedonian sources such as Leo VI and his son Constantine VII, as well as Joseph Genesius, exclude information regarding Basil's first marriage to Maria. Constantine VII states that all of his aunts and uncles were the legitimate children of Basil and Eudokia, and Leo goes further, stating that Basil and Eudokia produced children before being married to each other. Constantine VII gives an idealized version of Basil's reign, stating that when Basil was crowned at the Hagia Sophia, he was followed by a chariot containing Eudokia, Constantine, and Leo, and that both Constantine and Leo were crowned at the same time as Basil, in 867, with which no other source agrees. Anti-Macedonian sources, such as Symeon Logothete, usually assume that Constantine was the son of Eudokia, and provide information regarding the alleged infidelity of Eudokia, and the arrangement between Michael and Basil.

Parentages of the children of Basil I, by source
	Medieval sources					Modern sources						
Source and child	Symeon Logothete	George Hamartolos	Leo Grammaticus	Leo VI the Wise	Constantine VII	Nicholas Adontz	George Ostrogorsky	Cyril Mango	Judith Herrin	Shaun Tougher (1994)	Shaun Tougher (1997)	Lynda Garland and Shaun Tougher (2007)
Constantine	Uncertain	-	Michael and Eudokia	Basil and Eudokia		Basil and Maria			Michael/Basil and Eudokia	Basil/Michael and Eudokia	Basil/Michael and leans toward Eudokia	Basil and Maria/Eudokia; or Michael and Eudokia
Leo	Michael and Eudokia		Michael and Eudokia	Basil and Eudokia		Basil and Eudokia		Michael and Eudokia	Michael/Basil and Eudokia	Basil/Michael and Eudokia		
Stephen	Michael and Eudokia		Michael and Eudokia	Basil and Eudokia		Basil and Eudokia		-	Michael/Basil and Eudokia	Basil/Michael and Eudokia		
Alexander	Basil and Eudokia		-	Basil and Eudokia		Basil and Eudokia		-	Michael/Basil and Eudokia	Basil and Eudokia		

=== Later life ===
Basil rose to co-emperor by convincing Michael that his uncle Bardas was plotting against him and, after slaying Bardas with Michael's blessing, was crowned on 26 May 866. Tensions between Basil and Michael built up, and Basil feared that he would be replaced, as Michael had threatened to make the patrikios Basiliskianos emperor instead. Therefore, on the night of 23/24 September 867, Basil and his conspirators murdered Michael in his bed, making Basil the sole emperor.

Constantine, along with the rest of his brothers, was educated by Photios, later the Patriarch of Constantinople; Photios may also have been Constantine's godfather although some sources, such as Tougher, believe Photios was the godfather of Leo, rather than Constantine. Constantine is thought by historians to have received more direct education and attention from Basil, whereas his other brothers may have been accompanied by court eunuchs. Constantine was made co-emperor by Basil in c. January 868, and was his intended heir. Some historians date the coronation to 6 January 868, the Feast of Epiphany, but there is no certainty of this; the ceremony could also have taken place on 25 December 867. Although Leo was raised to co-emperor on 6 January 870, Tougher views it likely that although Leo technically shared in imperial status, he was intended to live a life of obscurity, existing only to secure the imperial succession, much as Alexander would later under Leo himself.

Constantine was engaged to Ermengard of Italy, the daughter of Holy Roman Emperor Louis II, in 870/871. The historians Charles Previté-Orton and Werner Ohnsorge take the position that they married, but Tougher (1994) argues that there is no evidence of this. Constantine served in military campaigns alongside his father, to prepare him to be a military leader, including a campaign in Syria, for which he shared a triumph in Constantinople with his father in 878. In January 879, Constantine and his father campaigned in the region of Germanicia, to great success. That summer, they returned and plundered Germanicia and Adata, and raided northern Mesopotamia. Constantine is mentioned as Emperor in The Acts of the Eighth Ecumenical Council. He also appears, bearing the title basileus, on several coins, alongside Basil and other members of his family.

==== Death ====
Constantine died unexpectedly of fever on 3 September 879, leaving Leo as the primary heir. Basil was severely affected by Constantine's death, and declared a period of mourning, possibly lasting up to six months, until 3 March 880. Much of the coinage made after Constantine's death focuses upon him. Jenkins says that after Constantine's death "Basil went out of mind, and continued during the next seven years to be subject to fits of derangement", and relates that Basil became violent and contemptuous toward Leo, whom he "had never cared for", despising his "bookish youth"; Tougher considers this "at best, an overstatement". Tougher does concede that pro-Macedonian sources have an obvious bias in declaring that Basil recovered "manfully, inspired by the example of Job", but believes Basil's shock was due more to the loss of an heir whom Basil had trained well, and expected to succeed him, rather than true favoritism. Basil also had Constantine declared a saint by Photios I, the Patriarch of Constantinople, confirmed by the Synaxarion of Constantinople. The Life of Ignatios states that Basil had numerous churches and monasteries built in honor of Constantine, including one at a location where Bishop Theodore Santabarenos was supposedly able to summon the ghost of Constantine for Basil.

After Constantine's death, Basil focused on securing his dynasty by marrying Leo to Theophano Martinakia, so they could produce heirs, and Tougher (1994) remarks that Basil may have become overprotective, shielding his remaining children from warfare. Alexander is believed to have been crowned emperor following Constantine's death, in 879. Basil imprisoned Leo and stripped him of imperial rank in 883, allegedly for his plans to usurp him, whereafter Alexander appears to have become the heir, until July 886, when Leo was released and restored as emperor. Just a month later, on 29 August 886, Basil died of wounds from a hunting trip, and Leo succeeded him.

== Sources ==
=== Primary sources ===
- Constantine VII
- George Hamartolos
- Joseph Genesius
- Leo VI
- Leo Grammaticus
- Niketas David Paphlagon
- Pseudo-Symeon
- Symeon Logothete
- The Theophanes Continuatus

== Notes ==
=== Bibliography ===
- Adontz, Nicholas (1956). "Basil I, the Armenian (Emperor of Byzantium 867–886)". Armenian Review. 9.
- Foss, Clive (2005). "Emperors named Constantine". Revue numismatique. 161 (6): 93–102. doi:10.3406/numi.2005.2594.
- Garland, Lynda; Tougher, Shaun (2007). "Roman Emperors – DIR Eudocia Ingerina". www.roman-emperors.org. Archived from the original on 26 August 2021.
- Gregory, Timothy E. (2010). A History of Byzantium. Chicester: Wiley-Blackwell. ISBN 978-1-4051-8471-7.
- Herrin, Judith (2001). Women in Purple: Rulers of Medieval Byzantium. Princeton, New Jersey: Princeton University Press. ISBN 978-0-691-11780-5.
- Jenkins, Romilly J. H. (1966). Byzantium: The Imperial Centuries, AD 610-1071. Toronto, Canada: University of Toronto Press. ISBN 978-0-8020-6667-1.
- Kazhdan, Alexander, ed. (1991). The Oxford Dictionary of Byzantium. Oxford and New York: Oxford University Press. ISBN 0-19-504652-8.
- Mango, Cyril (1973). "Eudocia Ingerina, the Normans, and the Macedonian Dynasty". Zbornika Radova Vizantoloskog Instituta. 14–15. ISSN 0584-9888.
- Ostrogorsky, George (1956). History of the Byzantine State. New Brunswick, New Jersey: Rutgers University Press. ISBN 978-0-813-51198-6.
- Spatharakis, Iohannis (1976). The Portrait in Byzantine Illuminated Manuscripts. Leiden: Brill. OCLC 904409632.
- Tougher, Shaun (1994). The Reign of Leo VI (886–912): Personal relationships and political ideologies (PhD thesis). St. Andrews: University of St. Andrews. hdl:10023/14582.
- Tougher, Shaun (1997). The reign of Leo VI (886–912): politics and people. Leiden: Brill. ISBN 978-90-04-10811-0.
- Treadgold, Warren (1997). A History of the Byzantine State and Society. Stanford, California: Stanford University Press. ISBN 0-8047-2630-2.
