= Battle of W.l.n.d.r =

934 battle

Battle of Wlndr
- Part of the Hungarian invasions of Europe
Date	March or April 934
Location	Somewhere in the First Bulgarian Empire probably Belgrade
Result	Hungarian–Pecheneg victory

Belligerents
Byzantine Empire; First Bulgarian Empire; Muslims converted to Christianity	Principality of Hungary; Pechenegs; Muslim auxiliary troops

Commanders and leaders
Unknown	Unknown

Strength
62,000	60,000

Casualties and losses
Heavy	Heavy

The Battle of Wlndr was fought in 934 between the allied Hungarian-Pecheneg army and an army composing of the forces of the Byzantine Empire and First Bulgarian Empire, somewhere in the territory which belonged to the Bulgarian empire, near a large city called W.l.n.d.r (perhaps Belgrade), recorded by the Arab historian and geographer Al-Masudi. The battle resulted in a great victory for the Hungarian-Pecheneg forces, which they followed with a devastating raid up to the walls of Constantinople, forcing the Byzantine Empire to pay them tribute for many years (until 957). Al-Masudi's account of the battle is "one of the greatest descriptions of the nomadic war tactics."

== Sources ==
Al-Masudi narrates an account of the battle and its causes in the 17th chapter of Vol. 2. of his work The Meadows of Gold, which is about the Caucasus and the countries and tribes which lived in it or north from it. In addition, the Byzantine chronicler Symeon the Metaphrast provides detailed information about the end of this campaign and the peace concluded between the Hungarian–Pecheneg alliance and the Byzantines.

In an academic work published in 1903, German historian Josef Marquart became the first scholar who considered the narrative from The Meadows of Gold to refer to the same events mentioned in the continuation of George Hamartolos' chronicle (Georgius Monachus Continuatus).

== Preliminary explanations ==
Al-Masudi is the only source that writes about the battle. His information about the location of the battle and the participants is a little confused. First, there is confusion about the place designated by the name W.l.n.d.r. Second, it is unclear precisely who participated in the battle on the side opposing the Byzantines, and how numerous they were. There are also questions about the Pecheneg involvement in the battle, and their number of troops.

=== Location ===
Al-Masudi, as an Arab, wrote in the Arabic alphabet, which does not use letters for short vowels (although there are special diacritics for short vowels, called ḥarakāt, but they are not generally used, and they were not used by Al-Masudi). As a result, when he wrote down names of foreign tribes, towns and countries, it is hard to know how these names sounded, because only consonants are known. This is the case with ولندر = W.l.n.d.r (و - W, ل - l, ن - n, د - d, ر - r). In the translated editions of his work, Latin transcriptions of W.l.n.d.r appear with vowels chosen by the editors (Walendar in the French translation of Barbier de Meynard and Pavet de Courteille from 1838, Valandar or Vanandar in the Turkish edition from 2004), in order to make it easier to pronounce. The Hungarian translation of the part of al-Masudi's work which refers to the battle, writes the name correctly, putting points in the place of the vowels (ex. W.l.n.d.r).

Al-Masudi wrote his accounts about northern countries based on verbal information from people who visited these regions. As a result, some of his information has to be handled with care. For example, he writes that W.l.n.d.r was a Greek town between the mountains and the sea, but historians such as György Györffy and Gyula Kristó – accepting the claim of Josef Marquart – believe that it was not a city but a derivation of the old name of the Bulgarians: Onogur/Onogundur (Ten Oghur Tribes), which sounded *wn^{o}ndur, which in old Hungarian became nándor, from which the old Hungarian name of Belgrade, Nándorfehérvár (White castle of the Bulgarians) originates, and in the works of the Arab geographer Ahmad ibn Rustah and the Persian geographer Abu Saʿīd Gardēzī, appears as W.n.n.d.r. So the historians conclude that W.l.n.d.r in reality was not a town, like al-Masudi believed, but the old name of the Bulgarians, so the battle was somewhere in the territory of the First Bulgarian Empire. Therefore, the battle was not fought around a town between the Byzantines and the Hungarian-Pecheneg army, but rather it was a battle between the Bulgarian Empire and the Byzantines against the Magyars and Pechenegs.

It is possible that the exact location of the battle was Belgrade, as orientalist Mihály Kmoskó considered, due to the fact that its old Hungarian name has in it the old, Turkic name of the Bulgarians in the form used by the Hungarians: nándor, and although is not near to a sea, but it is on the Danube's bank, which could be understood as sea, plus the Carpathian Mountains and Dinaric Alps are also close, and the mountain of Avala, and it was on the Hungarian border, so for its inhabitants would have been easy to attack their territories, as al-Masudi wrote. So in al-Masudi's text W.l.n.d.r could designate both the Bulgarians and the city of Belgrade, in some sentences designating the country, while others the city. But these are only suppositions. Josef Marquart identified the settlement with the fort Develtos laid near Burgas. Hansgerd Göckenjan and István Zimonyi considered Bulgarophygon (Babaeski) as the place of battle, based on the data that the relief army reached the besieged city in eight days from Constantinople.

=== Belligerents ===
Al-Masudi writes about four Turkic nations (a term designate the nomadic culture and lifestyle), who took part in the battle against the Byzantines:

- b.dʒ.n.k (بجناك), which can be identified with the name of the Pechenegs,
- y.dʒ.n.i (يجنى) or b.dʒ.n.i (بجنى) believed by the historians that also designates the Pechenegs,
- b.dʒ.g.r.d (بجغرد), which can be identified with the name Badjgird, used very often by the Arab historians and geographers to designate the domestic name of the Hungarians: Magyar (Ahmad ibn Fadlan, Abu Zayd al-Balkhi, Abū Hamid al-Gharnāti, etc.) in the 9th–12th centuries. This name in the 10–13th centuries was used by the Arab geographers for two groups: the Hungarians living in the Carpathian Basin, and the Hungarians who lived between the Kama River and the Ural Mountains in the place called Magna Hungaria, who remained there and maybe they became the ancestors of the today Bashkirs, like some believe. Maybe this is why the Hungarians and the people living in the early Middle Ages in today's Bashkortostan were named the same.
- nu.k.r.da (نوكردة), which original reading is probably Unkaríya, derives from the name Onogur/Ungar, designating the other name of the Magyars, in which they are known in the majority of the European languages: Hungarian/Ungar/венгерский/húngaro/hongrois. So, the historians think that, in the same way as for the b.dʒ.n.k and b.dʒ.n.i/y.dʒ.n.i (for the Pechenegs), al-Masudi mistakenly thought that the two names of the same tribal confederation (Magyar and Hungarian) designate two different nations.

In contrast, Gyula Kristó argued that these two names actually designate the two main components of the Principality of Hungary, forming the core of the Hungarian Nation: Magyars and Onogurs. Many sources (Vita Hrodberti episcopi Salisburgensis, Vita St. Paulini, Epitaphium Liutprandi regis Langobardorum, Annales Alamannici. Codex Modoetiensis, the Diploma of Louis the German from 860) prove that the Avars in the Middle and Late Avar period (670–804) and after the Carolingian conquest from 804 were often called Onogurs. Therefore, the b.dʒ.g.r.d could refer to the newly settled Magyars (895) and nu.k.r.da (Onogurs) to the descendants of the Avars, which survived during the Caroling and Bulgarian occupation of much of the Carpathian Basin (804-900), becoming the components of the Magyars, and in the same time gave the name which the Europeans use for denominating this nation. It is not excluded, that in 934, when the battle took place, the Onogurs in Hungary still had a kind of autonomy, with their own leaders, which may explain the fact that al-Masudi sees them as a separate political entity with its own king. About the Hungarian campaign in the Duchy of Saxony from 906, Annalista Saxo writes that of the two raiding Hungarian armies one was Avar and the second Magyar. This account could refer to the different ethnic component of the two armies which came from Hungary, and the fact that the successors of the Avars/Onogurs fought as separate armies under their own commanders, or the chronicler could not make difference between the Hungarian and Avar, and used when the one when the other name.

So as a response, to the question of who and how many were the nations who fought the Byzantines and the Bulgarians, the historians conclude that they were two nomadic political entities: the Principality of Hungary and the Pecheneg Tribal Confederation.

=== Involvement of the Pechenegs ===
Al-Masudi writes that the Pechenegs were stronger and more warlike than the Hungarians. He also writes that in the battle of W.l.n.d.r participated the kings of the Pechenegs and the Hungarians, and, because the unsuccessfulness of the fights of the first day, in the second day of the battle, the lead of the troops was taken by the Pecheneg king, who led to victory the allied nomadic troops. This information could be correct if there was no contradictory data from Byzantine chroniclers, about the campaign of 934, who write about the attack of the Τούρκων (Turks), the name in which they name the Hungarians in the 9–10th centuries, but do not mention anything about the Pecheneg (called by the Byzantine historians Moesians, Sarmatians, or Scythians, but never as Turks) participation in it. The fact that Byzantine chroniclers do not mention about the Pechenegs in this campaign, shows that their involvement was less important than al-Masudi writes. The Byzantines were directly implied in the events, and of course were much closer than al-Masudi who never traveled north to Caucasus, and took his information from others verbal accounts. Because the Hungarians were the westernmost participants of the events, it is probable that al-Masudi's informants did not met with them, and the information which they related to the Arab geographer, were taken from Pechenegs, who, of course, exaggerated their strength and importance in the battle. However the participation of the Pecheneg troops is confirmed by al-Masudi, but the information about the greater strength of the Pechenegs, their great scale participation, and the decisive importance of their leader in achieving the victory we have to take cautiously. The fact that the Pechenegs were not the leaders of this army is proven even by al-Masudi, when he writes that after the first day of the battle, the Pecheneg king asked for permission to make the battle plan for the second day, which request was granted to him. If the Pecheneg leader would be in charge, he would not had to ask permission to take over the lead of the army after the first day. The conclusion is that the campaign and the battle was led by a Hungarian commander, and the lead was given to the Pecheneg "king" only for the second day of the battle, after a common agreement. So, the Pecheneg commanders taking over the troops was only an exceptional case, and this contradict al-Masudi's affirmation about the Pecheneg superiority.

Some historians, basing on the accounts from De Administrando Imperio of Constantine VII, believe that the Hungarians were afraid of the Pechenegs, because the events from 895, when the Pechenegs, called by the Bulgarians, drove away the Hungarians from their old lands, forcing them to move to the Carpathian Basin, and starting the Hungarian Conquest. And the same writing claims that the Hungarians were terrorized even to think about the possibility of a war between them and the Pechenegs. But in the last years this question was researched by historians, and the conclusion was that the Byzantine accounts about the crushing defeat and the fear of the Hungarians from Pechenegs are overreacted, and sometimes even false. Al-Masudi's account too contradicts these claims from De Administrando Imperio: if the Hungarians were so terrorized by the Pechenegs, why would they enter in a war with them because the banal case of a foreign merchant? And if the Pechenegs felt so superior, why would they forgive the Hungarians for entering in a war with them, conclude peace with them in equal terms, moreover help them to avenge the Bulgarian attack on the Hungarian lands, letting them also to lead the campaign? In another contemporary work of a Byzantine emperor, Tactica of Leo VI the Wise written around 904, writes about the nations which use nomadic warfare: "The Scythian peoples ..., usually live a nomadic life. [Among them] only the Bulgarians and the Turks [Hungarians] care about the battle order, which is similar by [the both of] them, and because of this, they fight the close combat with greater strength, and [only they] are ruled by a single person". So, according to this work, which because, unlike the De Administrando Imperio, which is about politics, is a book about war strategy, so is more relevant from the point of view of the question in discussion, the Pechenegs were weak in battle organisation and close combat, in which the Hungarians are presented as good. Also, according to Leo the Wise, the Hungarians had the advantage of having a single ruler, while the Pechenegs never united and obeid to their own tribe chiefs. This shows again that Al-Masudi and Constantine VII were wrong when they wrote that the Hungarians were weaker than the Pechenegs.

=== Number of participants ===
Al-Masudi writes that the Hungarian–Pecheneg army was composed of 60,000 warriors, which they gathered with little effort, because if they would do a greater recruiting and concentration of troops, they could have 100,000 soldiers. It is known that in their campaign on a foreign country, the Hungarians never used their whole army, just a part of it, being aware of the fact that they have to leave a substantial number of warriors home, to defend their territory in case of a foreign attack. We have very few reliable accounts about the number of the Hungarian troops which took part in military actions of the period of the Hungarian invasions of Europe. For example, such informations like those given by the Annales Sangallenses maiores, which write about 100,000 Hungarian warriors who took part in the Battle of Lechfeld in 955, or 36,000 Hungarians killed in 933 in the Battle of Riade are highly exaggerated. The fact that the Arab geographer and historian Ahmad ibn Rustah wrote that the whole force of the Principality of Hungary at the beginning of the 10th century consisted from 20,000 warriors, shows very well how exaggerated were the above-mentioned numbers. More reliable sources about the Hungarian raids in Europe tell about armies between 200 and 5,000. As for the Battle of Lechfeld from 955, about which many historians think that it was the battle from the period of the Hungarian invasions in which the most Hungarian warriors participated, the modern historians conclude, that the Magyars had not 100,000, as mentioned before, but 6,000-8,000 warriors. So an army of 60,000 nomadic warriors is certainly exaggerated, even if we take into consideration also the participation of the Pechenegs and the warriors recruited from the Muslim merchants. In conclusion in the Battle of W.l.n.d.r could not participate more than 8,000 Hungarians, taken together with maximum an equal number of Pecheneg warriors, and maybe 1,000-2,000 Muslims, it was at most 18,000.

Al-Masudi writes that the Byzantine army consisted of 50,000 Greek soldiers plus 12,000 Arabs converted to Christianity, which fought as cavalry equipped with lances, and formed the vanguard of the army. But, as shown before, we know that the Christian army had also Bulgarian troops. We can give right to al-Masudi, when he writes that the Byzantine-Bulgarian army was larger than the Hungarian-Pecheneg one, but it was not much bigger, maximum 20,000.

=== Date ===
Al-Masudi writes that the battle took place around the year of 320 after the Hijra (932), or after that. The Byzantine chronicler Symeon the Metaphrast writes that the anti-Byzantine campaign of the Hungarians took place in the "seventh year of the indiction in the month of April". The historians agree that the seventh indiction means that it was the year 934. So if we accept April as the date they entered in the territory of the Byzantine Empire, which than, because of the great extent of the First Bulgarian Empire after the death of its emperor Simeon I, was near to Constantinople, and take in consideration that a nomadic army of riders was moving really fast, even if they stopped on the road to plunder, they made the road maximum in a month, so there is an assumption that the Battle of W.l.n.d.r was fought between the end of February and beginning of April.

== Background ==
After 927, the death of tsar Symeon I, the First Bulgarian Empire started its period of slow decline under the tsar Peter I. After the peace treaty between Peter I and the Byzantine emperor Romanos I Lekapenos, and the marriage between the Bulgarian ruler and Maria, the granddaughter of the Byzantine emperor, peace was installed between these two empires, which stood mostly in war during the reign of Simeon I, and this signified also alliance between the two empires.

In 933 a Magyar army was defeated in Battle of Riade by the Kingdom of Germany/Eastern Francia, with this the Principality of Hungary losing a substantial income: the German tribute, received with interruptions from 910. This is why, they had to look on other direction for achieving the tribute.

About the other reason we learn from al-Masudi, who writes in his account about the Battle of W.l.n.d.r, that during a Hungarian-Pecheneg war, which erupted because the people from one of the nomadic states had mistreated a Muslim merchant from the Persian city of Ardabil, who was in very good relations with the other, the people from W.l.n.d.r attacked their nomadic settlements, left without men, taking with them many children to be slaves, and drove away the cattle. If we accept that W.l.n.d.r designates the town of Belgrade, than part of the Bulgarian Empire, the attack of its soldiers had to be made against the Hungarians, which lands were on the northern side of the Danube, on which southern banks lied the city. The Pecheneg closest settlements had to be much farther from Belgrade to east, their closest territory being today's Oltenia, so, because of the distance, an attack against them would be harder, more dangerous, or to attack both the Hungarians and the Pechenegs would be unwise, making two dangerous enemies at once. Learning about this attack, the Hungarians and the Pechenegs made an armistice, mutually gave up the blood money for those killed in the battles, and decided to attack the town together. This shows a kind of nomadic solidarity, undocumented before.

== Prelude ==
In early spring 934 the Hungarians and the Pechenegs, with 60,000 warriors, entered Bulgaria and attacked the city of W.l.n.d.r. When the Byzantine emperor Romanos I Lekapenos heard about this, he sent 12,000 Muslim warriors converted to Christianity, together with 50,000 Byzantine troops, as al-Masudi writes. It is certain that the Bulgarians too joined them with several thousands soldiers. However, as shown before, the real numbers had to be around 18,000 nomads to 20,000 Christians. The Byzantine army was sent to help their allies, the Bulgarians, attacked by the nomads.

The Byzantine troops arrived in eight days to W.l.n.d.r. Al-Masudi mentions that until they arrived, the Hungarian-Pechenegs massacred many people from W.l.n.d.r or Bulgaria, many saving themselves only by retreating behind the walls of the town. The two armies camped in front of each other for several days.

When the nomadic allies learned that the Byzantines had among them a large contingent of former Muslims converted to Christianity, they sent this news to the Muslim merchants originating from Khazaria, Transcaucasia, Alania and other territories, who lived among them, and those Pechenegs and Hungarians who became Muslims, and did not wanted to fight anybody but the "infidels", in order to convince them to help them against the Christians. It seems that the leaders of the Hungarians and Pechenegs knew very well that Apostasy is one of the worst crimes in Islam, considered to be a Hudud or crime against Allah, punished by death, and used this to convince them to fight against the Byzantines and Bulgarians, by fueling their hatred against the apostates. So the Hungarian-Pecheneg army was joined by a certain number of Muslims, who accepted to fight in the first line to fight directly with the apostates, who also were the avantgarde of the Byzantine-Bulgarian army.

== Battle ==
The battle lasted two days.

In the first day, before the battle, the Muslim merchants who stood in the frontline of the Hungarian-Pecheneg side, went to the Byzantine avantgarde, where the apostate Muslim cavalry stood, and tried to convince them to re-convert to their original faith, go with them to the "Turkish" (Hungarian-Pecheneg) side, promising that the Hungarians and Pechenegs will help them to return to the Muslim lands, but they refused. Then the battle started and the Byzantine-Bulgarian army came out ahead, ending the day with a partial victory. Because the Muslim merchants troops on the Hungarian-Pecheneg side are not mentioned after this by Al-Masudi, we can conclude that their role in the battle diminished.

During the night the two armies remained in battle order, while the leaders of the nomadic army had a council of war. As al-Masudi reports, the Pecheneg "king" asked permission for him to command the army, because he said that he knew the way to beat the Byzantine-Bulgarian army. His request was granted.

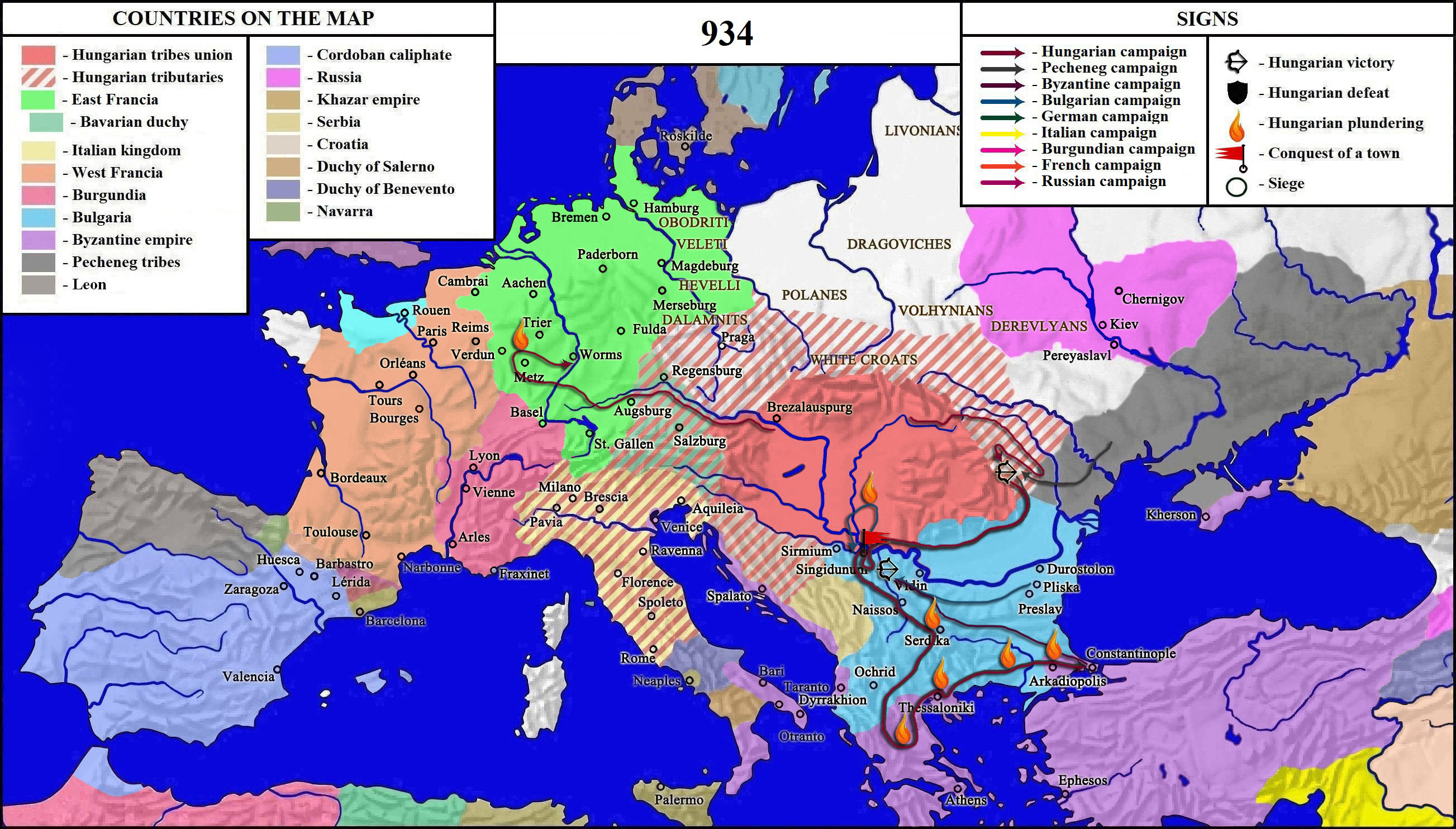
The Hungarian campaign of 934 against Bulgaria and the Byzantine empire, which resulted the start of the Byzantine tribute towards the Hungarians.

At the dawn of the second day, the Pecheneg king formed many equestrian detachments of 1000 men and positioned them next to the left and the right wing of the nomadic army. At the beginning of the battle, the equestrian detachments from the left wing neared the right wing of the Christian army, then went rightward towards the Christian center, then went to the right wing of the Hungarian-Pecheneg army. During their movement, they shot a rain of arrows towards the Byzantine-Bulgarian right wing, then the center. The equestrian detachments from the nomadic right wing did the same thing in the opposite direction. These detachments met at the center of the Christian army, together showering it with a blanket of arrows, before they separated, riding towards the other wing of their own army. Then they repeated the same attacks, riding from right to left, then left to right, shooting arrows on the enemy non-stop. These actions were repeated without stopping, the detachments moving like the millstones during grinding, al-Masudi writes. During all these the Hungarian-Pecheneg center, right, and left wings stood still.

The relentless attacks of the equestrian detachments caused heavy losses to the Byzantine-Bulgarian army, which became weaker and weaker, and their lines started to disintegrate, while they could do nothing to stop these attacks. As a final solution, the Christian army, with its broken lines, started a general attack against the center of the nomadic army, which did no action until that and because of this, it was totally reposeful. When the Bulgarian-Byzantines arrived near to it, the nomadic army suddenly split, and let the Christians to enter in the middle, then shot a rain of arrows from both sides on them, this causing huge losses and the total falling apart of their organisation, then the Hungarian-Pecheneg army started a general attack, with their ordered battle lines, on the enemy, causing them to start to flee, but the majority of the Christians had no way to run, because they were encircled. Al-Masudi underlines that until this moment the nomadic army had not used any close range weapons, only their bows which caused the Byzantine-Bulgarians so many losses, but now they pulled out their swords, and started to cut down the enemy. The nomadic soldiers chased the surviving enemy.

Al-Masudi underlines the fact that the purpose of the nomads, which they saw as the key of the victory, was to break up the battle order of the enemy while keeping theirs intact, and with it, in the right moment to obtain victory over the disordered mass of enemy soldiers.

Al-Masudi writes that the Byzantine-Bulgarians lost 60,000 soldiers from 62,000, numbers which of course are exaggerated, knowing that in reality their army had to be around 20,000 men, but nevertheless from the description of the battle, we understand that their defeat was crushing, so they probably lost the majority of their soldiers. The Arab geographer and historian exaggerates to show the huge number of dead Christians, that their dead bodies were used by the Hungarians and Pechenegs to climb the walls of W.l.n.d.r, and to take the city. The nomads plundered the city for three days, killing many people, and those who survived were taken as captives.

== Aftermath ==
After taking W.l.n.d.r (as shown before, we presume that the city was Belgrade), the nomadic army went towards Constantinople. Al-Masudi mentions that they went along the way on fields, farms, which they plundered, killing many people, and took the others in captivity. Symeon the Metaphrast writes that they galloped until they reached Constantinople, and took captive "every Thracian". Al-Masudi writes that they camped in front of the great city for 40 days, they sold the children and women for clothes made from textile, brocade and silk. But they killed every one of their male captives, sometimes killing women too. This shows their anger against those who attacked their settlements and drove away their children. This was part of the psychological warfare used often by the nomads, who tried to frighten the enemy in this way, convincing them, that such an attack against them will provoke great suffering to the attackers and their families. Than al-Masudi writes that expended their raids in those territories, their raiding detachments reaching the "countries of the Romans and the Slavs". The last information about this campaign and its end we learn from Symeon the Metaphrast Logothetes, who writes that the emperor sent the patrician and protovestiarios Theophanes, who concluded peace with the Hungarians (as mentioned before, the Byzantine chronicle does not know anything about the Pechenegs, only the Hungarians), paying for the release of every captive. The Byzantines with this peace treaty, also accepted to pay tribute to the Hungarians, which extended in 943, lasted until 957.

== Different theory ==
According to historians János B. Szabó and Balázs Sudár, there is no evidence that the relevant records from The Meadows of Gold and the Byzantine chronicles – primarily Georgius Monachus Continuatus – refer to the same battle, as there are a number of uncertainties and contradictions between the two types of sources at several points. According to the two historians, the Battle of W.l.n.d.r, which appears in Al-Masudi's work, is not part of the history of Hungary in the Carpathian Basin nor the Hungarian invasions of Europe.

The two historians argue when Al-Masudi writes of 12,000 Arab warriors who converted to Christianity, he refers to the tribe Banu Habib, numbering 12,000 horsemen and their families, converted to Christianity in 935 or 936 when they defected to the Byzantine Empire. The tribe were entrusted the protect the empire along its eastern border against the advancing Hamdanid dynasty. Instead of the Balkan Peninsula, the two historians place the Battle of W.l.n.d.r to the Caucasus, where Byzantine emperor Romanos I Lekapenos pursued an active foreign policy against the Arabs, as a theater of the longstanding Arab–Byzantine wars. Analyzing Al-Masudi's geographical names, B. Szabó and Sudár claim, the four Turkic peoples lived in the area west of Alania and Khazaria along the rivers Sal and Manych. According to the De Administrando Imperio, Pecheneges (identified with "b.dʒ.n.k") of the Pontic–Caspian steppe also lived in that territory surrounding the northwestern part of Caucasus. Based on the remarks of the contemporary Arab geographer Istakhri, refers to the people "b.dʒ.g.r.d" too, this Turkic people also lived in that area.

B. Szabó and Sudár argues the four Turkic peoples appears additionally in At-Tanbih wa-l-'Ishraf ("Admonition and Revision"), Al-Masudi's other work, under a common summary term, vlndrija, who lived in the area of city W.l.n.d.r at the Byzantium's furthest ends bordering the East. The two historians consider the settlement can be identified with Vanand (Kars) in present-day Turkey or Onoguris in present-day western Georgia, along with a certain "Vnndr" in Khazaria. Al-Masudi distinguishes the "W.l.n.d.r" people from the Danube Bulgarians and Volga Bulgars. B. Szabó and Sudár consider the "b.dʒ.g.r.d" people are belonged to the so-called Eastern Hungarians or Savard Hungarians.
