= Pseudo-Simeon =

Late 10th-century author

Pseudo-Simeon (or Pseudo-Symeon Magistros) is the conventional name given to the anonymous author of a late 10th-century Byzantine Greek chronicle which survives in a single codex, Parisinus Graecus 1712, copied in the 12th or 13th century.

It is a universal history from the creation of the world to the year 963. His main sources are Theophanes the Confessor and Symeon Logothete. For the years up to 812, he uses Theophanes, George Hamartolos, John Malalas and John of Antioch. For later years, he uses parts of Joseph Genesius and the anonymous Chronicle on Leo the Armenian. He made use of a lost anti-Photian tract that was also used by Niketas David Paphlagon.

George Kedrenos used Pseudo-Simeon as the model for his own chronicle up to the year 812. In the 14th century, the chronicle was translated into Slavonic.
