= Vita Basilii =

The Vita Basilii (Greek: Βίος Βασιλείου, romanized: Bios Basileiou, "Life of Basil") is an anonymous biography of the Emperor Basil I, the first Byzantine emperor of the Macedonian dynasty. It is the second work in the collection known as Theophanes Continuatus. It may have been written around 950 by the emperor's grandson, the Emperor Constantine VII, or perhaps by Theodore Daphnopates.

The Vita Basilii is a panegyric devoted to extolling Basil, both his personal virtues and his benevolent government. Although he was the first of his family on the throne, he is said to have noble ancestry. He is contrasted with the heroes of antiquity, rather than compared to them. Michael III, the emperor whom Basil replaced, is portrayed as the anti-Basil and "the embodiment of evil". A similarly hostile treatment is given to Constantine's father-in-law and co-emperor, Romanos I (920–45), who was not a Macedonian but a Lekapenos.

The panegyric portrays Basil as a wise and just ruler, under whose rule the peasants tilled their fields in peace. The emperor himself, in his capacity as a judge, is said to have protected the poor from unjust tax collectors. In general officials, such as tax collectors and especially eunuchs, are portrayed negatively. The focus of the piece is civil, not military; Basil's architectural feats, such as his work on the Great Palace of Constantinople, are described in detail, whereas his career in warfare is covered sparingly and his defeats are not glossed over.

The Vita was influenced by the biographies in Plutarch's Parallel Lives, mainly that of Mark Antony and possibly that of Nero, which is now lost. It was either used as a source by the contemporary historian Joseph Genesius or else there lies behind both a common source, now lost.

== Editions ==
- Ševčenko, Ihor, ed. (2011). Chronographiae quae Theophanis Continuati nomine fertur Liber quo Vita Basilii Imperatoris amplectitur: Recensuit Anglice vertit indicibus instruxit Ihor Ševčenko. Corpus Fontium Historiae Byzantinae, 42. De Gruyter. doi:10.1515/9783110227390. ISBN 978-3-11-018477-8. Includes an edition of the Greek text, an English translation and an introduction by Cyril Mango.
