= Scriptor Incertus =

Scriptor Incertus de Leone Armeno ("unknown writer on Leo the Armenian") is the conventional Latin designation given to the anonymous author of a 9th-century Byzantine historical work, of which only two fragments survive.

The first fragment, preserved in the 13th-century Vat. gr. 2014 manuscript (interposed into descriptions of the Avaro-Persian siege of Constantinople and the Second Arab Siege of Constantinople, as well as hagiographical texts) in the Vatican Library, deals with the 811 campaign of Emperor Nikephoros I (r. 802–811) against the Bulgars, which ended in the disastrous Battle of Pliska. Discovered and published in 1936 by I. Dujčev, it is also known as the Chronicle of 811, or the Dujčev Fragment.

The second, which is preserved in the early 11th-century B.N. gr. 1711 manuscript in the Bibliotheque Nationale in Paris along with the chronicle of the so-called "Leo Grammaticus", deals with the reigns of Michael I Rhangabe (r. 811–813) and Leo V the Armenian (r. 813–820) that followed after Nikephoros I. The date of authorship is disputed, but the vividness of the narrative suggests that it was written by a contemporary of the events described.

The two fragments were identified as forming part of the same work by Henri Grégoire based on similarities in style. Although generally an unreliable indicator, this hypothesis has since been commonly accepted. Both fragments provide information not included in the contemporary histories of Theophanes the Confessor and Theophanes Continuatus, and Grégoire hypothesized, again based on style, that the Scriptor Incertus was a continuation of the work of the 6th-century historian John Malalas. The second fragment was known to, and used by, the late 10th-century Pseudo-Symeon Magister, but he does not appear to have used it for the sections of his history before Michael I.

== Editions ==
- 1st fragment, critical edition with French translation, I. Dujčev, "La chronique byzantine de l'an 811", in: Travaux et Mémoires 1, 1965, pp. 205–254. English translation in WikiSource.
- 2nd fragment included in the Bonn series edition of "Leo Grammaticus", Bonn, 1842, pp. 335–362 (archive.org link); corrections and commentary on the Bonn edition by Robert Browning.
- Critical edition of both fragments with Italian translation, Francesca Iadevaia, Scriptor incertus: testo critico, traduzione e note., Messina, 1st ed. 1987, 2nd ed. 1997, pp. 149

Additional literature is given by Paul Stephenson.

== Sources ==
- Browning, Robert (1965). "Notes on the "Scriptor Incertus de Leone Armeno"". Byzantion (in French). 35: 389–411.
- Grégoire, Henri (1936). "Un nouveau fragment du "Scriptor incertus de Leone Armeno"". Byzantion (in French). 11: 417–420.
- Kazhdan, Alexander (1991). "Scriptor Incertus". In Kazhdan, Alexander (ed.). The Oxford Dictionary of Byzantium. Oxford and New York: Oxford University Press. pp. 1855–1856. ISBN 0-19-504652-8.
- Neville, Leonora (2018). Guide to Byzantine Historical Writing. Cambridge University Press. ISBN 978-1-108663946.
- Stephenson, Paul (2010) [2003]. "The Chronicle of 811 and the Scriptor Incertus". Archived from the original on 24 February 2021.
