= George Kedrenos =

11th century Byzantine historian

George Kedrenos, Cedrenus or Cedrinos (Greek: Γεώργιος Κεδρηνός, fl. 11th century) was a Byzantine Greek historian. In the 1050s he compiled Synopsis historion (also known as A concise history of the world), which spanned the time from the biblical account of creation to his own day. Kedrenos is one of the few sources that discuss Khazar polities in existence after the sack of Atil in 969 (see Georgius Tzul).

Material in Synopsis historion mostly comes from the works by Pseudo-Symeon Magistros^{(de)} (a version of Logothete's chronicle^{(de)}), George Syncellus, Theophanes the Confessor, and, starting from 811, almost exclusively and word-for-word from the chronicle by John Skylitzes.

One late manuscript of Synopsis historion preserves a poem (anonymous but thought to be by Kedrenos) that derives his family name from the place where he was born, a small village of Cedrus (or Cedrea) in the Anatolic Theme. The poem also identifies him as a proedrus, a senior court official.

Before becoming a proedros, Kedrenos may have held the somewhat lower rank of vestarches. Vestarches Georgios Kedrenos is in fact known from a number of 11th–12th-century seals found mostly in the Danube region, but also in Crimea. Furthermore, several roughly contemporary seals refer to another court official, a certain "John Cedrenus, protocuropalates and duke" who may have been a relative, perhaps a brother or a cousin.
