= Albert Ehrhard =

German Catholic theologian, church historian and Byzantinist

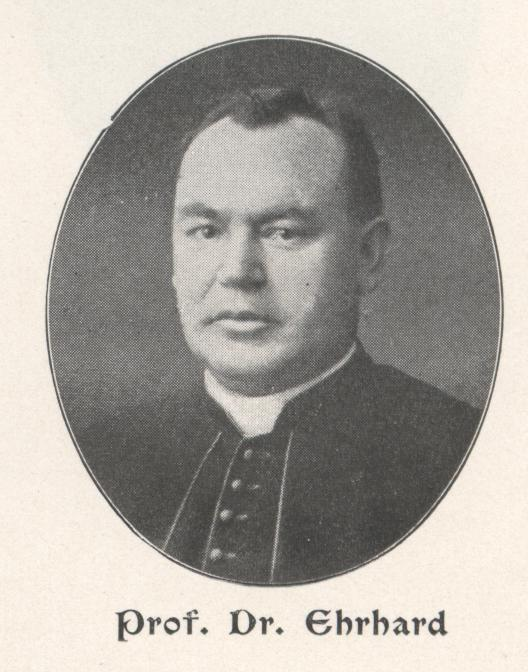
Albert Ehrhard (1905)

Albert Joseph Maria Ehrhard (14 March 1862 – 23 September 1940) was a German Catholic theologian, church historian and Byzantinist. He was the author of numerous works on Early Christianity.

== Biography ==
Born in Herbitzheim (Alsace), Ehrhard studied theology at Würzburg and Münster, being ordained as a priest in 1885, then received his doctorate of theology in 1888. From 1889 he served as a professor of dogmatics at the Roman Catholic seminary in Strasbourg. From 1892 to 1898 he was a professor of church history at the University of Würzburg, and afterwards held professorships in Vienna (from 1898), Freiburg (from 1902) and Strasbourg (from 1903), where in 1911/12 he served as university rector. From 1920 to 1927 he was a professor of church history at the University of Bonn.

He died in Bonn aged 78.

== Selected works ==
- Die altchristliche Literatur und ihre Erforschung seit 1880 (1894) – Early Christian literature and its research since 1880.
- Die altchristliche Litteratur und ihre Erforschung von 1884-1900 (1894) – Early Christian literature and its research from 1884 to 1900.
- Forschungen zur hagiographie der griechischen kirche, vornehmlich auf grund der hagiographischen handschriften von Mailand (1897) – Research involving the hagiography of the Greek church.
- Geschichte der byzantinischen Litteratur (with Karl Krumbacher, Heinrich Gelzer, 1897) – History of Byzantine literature.
- Der Katholizismus und das zwanzigste Jahrhundert im Lichte der kirchlichen Entwicklung der Neuzeit (1902) – Catholicism and the twentieth century in the light of ecclesiastical development in the modern age.
- Die Griechischen Martyrien (1907) – The Greek martyrs.
- Das Mittelalter und seine kirchliche Entwickelung (1908) – The Middle Ages and ecclesiastical development.
- Urchristentum und Katholizismus : drei Vorträge (1926) – Early Christianity and Catholicism: three lectures.
- Das Christentum im Römischen Reich bis Konstantin (1932) – Christianity in the Roman Empire prior to Constantine the Great.
- Die Kirche der Märtyer; ihre Aufgaben und ihre Leistungen (1932) – The church of the martyrs.
- Urkirche und Frühkatholizismus (1935) – The early Church and early Catholicism.
