= Theodore Daphnopates =

Byzantine official and author

Theodore Daphnopates (Greek: Θεόδωρος Δαφνοπάτης) was a senior Byzantine official and author. He served as imperial secretary, and possibly protasekretis, under three emperors, Romanos I Lekapenos, Constantine VII Porphyrogennetos, and Romanos II, rising to the ranks of patrikios and magistros, and the post of Eparch of the City. Daphnopates' public career ended with the accession of Nikephoros II Phokas in 963, when he went into retirement. Daphnopates also participated in the encyclopaedism movement, writing several homilies and theological as well as historical works, few of which survive. Daphnopates is best known for his surviving correspondence and is considered by some modern scholars as the author of the last section of the chronicle of Theophanes Continuatus.

== Life ==
Daphnopates was probably born between 890 and 900. He was of Armenian origin, and apparently spoke Armenian, as he translated a letter by the Bishop of Siwnik, written in Armenian, into Greek. Although he lived and worked in Constantinople, his family hailed from elsewhere, as he records in a letter a visit by his mother by ship to Pylae, on the Asian shore of the Propontis, probably during the early 920s. During the return trip, Daphnopates himself nearly drowned when a heavy storm came upon his ship. Only with great effort and luck was the ship able to reach the coast at Cape Akritas.

Daphnopates first appears in the sources in the mid-920s, having apparently entered the service of the imperial court shortly before. In 924/5, Daphnopates composed three replies of Emperor Romanos I Lekapenos (r. 920–944), to letters by Tsar Symeon I of Bulgaria. In these letters, Romanos I criticized Symeon as rapacious and warlike, while trying to move him to accept a peace bringing an end to the long war between Byzantium and Bulgaria. Ten more letters to rulers and ecclesiastical leaders in Bulgaria and Armenia, written on behalf of Romanos I in the period 925–933, survive, indicating that Daphnopates probably held the post of head of the imperial chancery (protasekretis). A number of modern scholars—Ivan Dujčev, R. J. H. Jenkins, and Patricia Karlin-Hayter—have suggested that Daphnopates was the author of the anonymous speech celebrating the conclusion of peace with Bulgaria in 927 (ἐπὶ τῇ τῶν Βουλγάρων συμβάσει) and the concurrent marriage of Tsar Peter, the son and successor of Symeon, with Maria Lekapene, the granddaughter of Romanos I. The Greek historian Alkmini Stavridou-Zafraka however rejected this identification.

Daphnopates remained active in the imperial chancery under Constantine VII (r. 913–920, 945–59) after 945. In late 945/6 he composed a symbolic letter addressed by the emperor to Saint Gregory of Nazianzus (Letter No. 11). At about the same time he also wrote a letter to the emperor himself concerning a eulogy on a recently deceased person, identified by modern scholars with Romanos Lekapenos, who died on 15 June 948. In return, the emperor sent a courtier with rich gifts. Daphnopates' further activity under Constantine VII is obscure, but he reappears under his successor Romanos II (r. 959–963) in the same capacity. Three letters (Nos. 13, 14, 16) survive addressed to the emperor, and one letter (No. 15) by Romanos II to Daphnopates. Romanos II further promoted Daphnopates to the high post of Eparch of the City. Letter No. 15 indicates his closeness to the emperor, who requested him to interpret a dream that he had had. In accordance to this dream, the emperor intended to reinstate an anonymous leading official, who some modern scholars have identified as Daphnopates' predecessor and eventual successor as Eparch, Sisinnios, or the Patriarch of Constantinople, Polyeuctus. Either because he was directly affected, or because he was not in favour of restoring the official in question, Daphnopates sent an evasive reply.

After the death of Romanos II on 15 March 963, Daphnopates apparently composed his funeral oration. Shortly after, following the rise of Nikephoros II Phokas (r. 963–969) to the throne, he retired from public service. The most probable reason for this retirement was his age, since he does not appear to have been punished in any way by the new regime. Daphnopates continued to correspond with high officials, including his successors, Sisinnios and Constantine, keeping up connections or intervening on behalf of former colleagues. To the same period probably are to be dated two further letters consoling disgraced officials.

== Writings ==
Apart from his political work and his correspondence, Daphnopates was an active author, although most of his works do not survive. He wrote a number of homilies and hagiographies (on Saint George, Theophanes the Confessor, and of version A of the hagiography of Theodore Stoudites; the latter is sometimes attributed to Michael Monomachos), as well as composing a collection of excerpts of John Chrysostom, in what Alexander Kazhdan called "a work typical of 10th-century encyclopaedism". The 11th-century historian John Skylitzes mentions him as having written a chronicle which he used, and as Skylitzes made use of parts of Theophanes Continuatus for earlier events, modern scholarship generally considers him the author of the final portion of the Theophanes Continuatus, bringing the work up to 963. His authorship has been rejected, however, by several scholars, including A. Markopoulos ("Theodore Daphnopatès et la Continuation de Théophane", JÖB 35 (1985), pp. 171–182), the authors of the French edition of Skylitzes' history, Bernard Flusin and Jean-Claude Cheynet, and by the editors of Daphnopates' correspondence, J. Darrouzès and L. G. Westerink.

Daphnopates' correspondence, including an epitaph on Romanos II, was published in a critical edition by J. Darrouzès and L. G. Westerink: Théodore Daphnopatès, Correspondance, Paris: CNRS (1978). For his theological and hagiographical works, cf. V. Latyšev, "Dve reči Feodora Dafnopata", PPSb 59 (1910), pp. 15–38. The speech on the Bulgarian treaty has been edited by A. Stavridou-Zafraka in Byzantina 8 (1974), pp. 343–406, and translated into English by I. Dujčev, "On the Treaty of 927 with the Bulgarians", in Dumbarton Oaks Papers 32 (1978), pp. 217–295.

== Sources ==
- Holmes, Catherine (2005). Basil II and the Governance of Empire (976–1025). New York: Oxford University Press. ISBN 0-19-927968-3.
- Kazhdan, Alexander (1991). "Daphnopates, Theodore". In Kazhdan, Alexander (ed.). The Oxford Dictionary of Byzantium. Oxford and New York: Oxford University Press. p. 588. ISBN 0-19-504652-8.
- Lilie, Ralph-Johannes; Ludwig, Claudia; Pratsch, Thomas; Zielke, Beate (2013). Prosopographie der mittelbyzantinischen Zeit Online. Berlin-Brandenburgische Akademie der Wissenschaften. Nach Vorarbeiten F. Winkelmanns erstellt (in German). Berlin and Boston: De Gruyter.
- Wortley, John, ed. (2010). John Skylitzes: A Synopsis of Byzantine History, 811–1057. Cambridge: Cambridge University Press. ISBN 978-0-521-76705-7.
