= Niketas David Paphlagon =

Niketas David Paphlagon (Greek: Νικήτας Δαβὶδ Παφλαγών), also known as Nicetas the Paphlagonian or Nicetas of Paphlagonia, was a prolific Byzantine Greek writer of the late 9th and early 10th century.

Older scholarship dated Niketas' death to about 890, but more recent research suggests that he was born around 885 and was active as late as 963. He was a disciple of Arethas of Caesarea. In a letter, Arethas calls him a scholastikos, meaning lawyer. "David" appears to be a religious name, which he may have taken later in life. When Arethas, under pressure from Pope Nicholas I, moved to support the tetragamy (Note: The legitimization of Leo VI's son by a concubine after his three marriages failed to produce an heir.) of the Emperor Leo VI, Niketas distributed all his master's goods to the poor and fled to Thrace. He was arrested and imprisoned in Constantinople. The Patriarch Euthymios I secured his release, but forced him to live in seclusion for two years.

Niketas was a prolific author on Christian topics. He wrote about fifty hagiographies, a treatise on calculating the end times, a commentary on the Psalms and many other works, including possibly pamphlets against Leo VI and Euthymios. In his commentary, he provides a moral exhortation for every psalm, which was an innovation at the time. He also evinces a strong dislike of musical instruments. His biography of Ignatios of Constantinople functions also as a tract against Photios. It was probably written in the 910s. His biography of Gregory of Agrigento was highly esteemed by Symeon the Metaphrast, who included it in his synaxarium. He was accused of heresy for proclaiming himself God, although this probably means only that he emphasised the divine nature in man.
