= George Hamartolos =

9th-century Byzantine monk

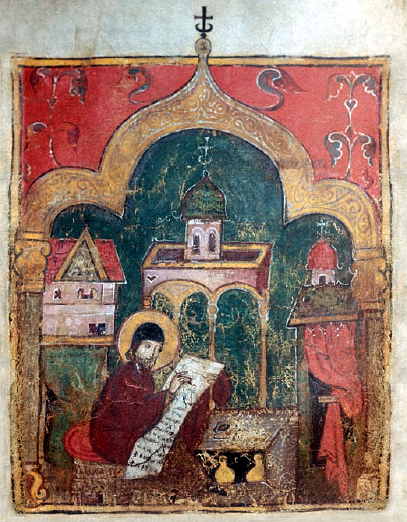
"George the Monk at work", an early 14th-century miniature from Tver, Russia

George Hamartolos or Hamartolus (Greek: Γεώργιος Ἁμαρτωλός) was a Byzantine monk in Constantinople under Michael III (840–867) and the author of a chronicle of some importance. Hamartolus is not his name but the epithet he gives to himself in the title of his work: "A compendious chronicle from various chroniclers and interpreters, gathered together and arranged by George, a sinner (ὐπὸ Γεωργίου ἁμαρτωλοῦ)". It is a common form among Byzantine monks. 19th-century German 19th scholar Karl Krumbacher (Byz. Litt., 358) protested against the use of this epithet as a name and proposed (and used) the form Georgios Monachos (Γεώργιος Μοναχός, 'George the Monk').

Nothing is known about him except from the internal evidence of his work, which establishes his period (in the preface he speaks of Michael III as the reigning emperor) and his calling (he refers to himself several times as a monk).

== Chronicle ==
The chronicle consists of four books, covering:

1. secular history from Adam to Alexander the Great
2. the history of the Old Testament
3. Roman history from Julius Caesar to Constantine
4. history up to the author's own time

The chronicle is potentially the only original contemporary authority for the years 813–842, the other being (depending on its dating) the Scriptor Incertus. Because of this fact, it is indispensable. As usually in the case of such medieval chronicles, the only part to be taken seriously is the account of more or less contemporary events. The rest is interesting as an example of Byzantine ideas on the subjects, and of the questions that most interested Byzantine monks.

George describes his ideal and principles in the preface. He has used ancient Greek and modern Greek sources, has especially consulted edifying works, and has striven to relate such things as were useful and necessary, with a strict adherence to truth, rather than to please the reader by artistic writing or pretensions to literary style. But of so great a mass of material he has chosen only what is most useful and necessary. In effect, the questions that seemed most useful and necessary to ecclesiastical persons at Constantinople in the ninth century are those that are discussed. There are copious pious reflections and theological excursuses. He writes of how idols were invented, the origin of monks, the religion of the Saracens, and especially of the Iconoclast controversy that had just ended. Like all monks, he hated iconoclasts. The violence with which he speaks of them shows how recent the storm had been and how the memory of iconoclast persecutions was still fresh when he wrote. He writes out long extracts from Greek Fathers.

The first book treats of an astonishingly miscellaneous collection of persons — Adam, Nimrod, the Persians, Chaldees, Brahmins, Amazons, etc. In the second book, too, although it professes to deal with Bible history only, he has much to say about Plato and philosophers in general. Hamartolus ended his chronicle with the year 842, as a colophon in most manuscripts attests.

=== Continuations ===
Various people, among them notably "Symeon Logothetes", who is probably Symeon Metaphrastes, the famous writer of saints' lives (tenth century, see Krumbacher, 358), continued his history to later dates — the longest continuation reaches to 948. In these additions, religious questions are relegated to the background, more attention is devoted to political history, and the language is more popular. Still further continuations of little value go down to 1143.

In spite of his crude ideas and the violent hatred of iconoclasts that makes him always unjust towards them, his work has considerable value for the history of the last years - before the schism between Photius and Nicholas of Rome. It was soon translated into Church Slavonic and also in Georgian by Arsen of Iqalto. In these versions it became a sort of fountain-head for all early Slavonic historians, most notably Nestor. As a very popular and widely consulted book of large circulation it has been constantly re-edited, corrected, and rearranged by anonymous scribes, so that the reconstruction of the original work is "one of the most difficult problems of Byzantine philology" (Krumbacher, 355).

== Editions ==
- Combefis, François (ed.). "Bioi ton neon Basileon (βίοι τῶν νέων βασιλέων)." In Maxima bibliotheca (Scriptores post Theophanem) Paris, 1685; reprinted, Venice, 1729. The last part of Book IV of the chronicle and the continuation (813–948).
- Muralt, E. de (ed). Georgii monachi, dicti Hamartoli, Chronicon ab orbe condito ad annum p. chr. 842 et a diversis scriptoribus usq. ad ann. 1143 continuatum. St. Petersburg, 1859. The first edition of the whole work. It does not represent the original text, but one of the many modified versions (from a Moscow twelfth-century manuscript), and is in many ways deficient and misleading (see Krumbacher's criticism in Byz. Litt., p. 357).
- Migne, Jacques Paul. Patrologia Graeca 110. Paris, 1863. Reprint of the previous edition, with a Latin translation.
- de Boor, C. (ed.). Georgii monachi chronicon. 2 vols. Leipzig: Teubner, 1904, Repr. 1978 (corr. P. Wirth)
