= Alexander (Byzantine emperor) =

Byzantine emperor from 912 to 913

- Emperor and Autocrat of the Romans
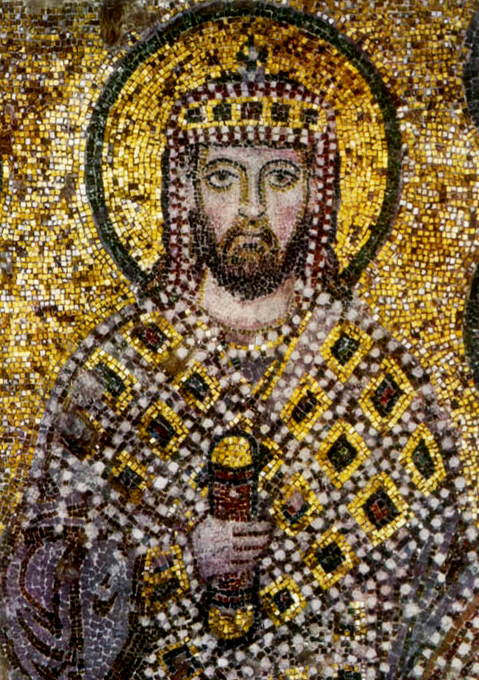
- Mosaic of Emperor Alexander in Hagia Sophia. He wears a loros and holds the akakia in his right hand.

Byzantine emperor
- Reign: 11 May 912 – 6 June 913
- Coronation: c. September 879 (Note: There is some evidence that Alexander was already crowned by August 879, but most sources agree that he was appointed co-emperor following the death of his brother Constantine. He was certainly made co-emperor before November 879.)
- Predecessor: Leo VI
- Successor: Constantine VII
- Born: 23 November 870; Constantinople (now Istanbul, Turkey)
- Died: 6 June 913 (aged 42)
Regnal name
- Alexander Augustus
- Dynasty: Macedonian
- Father: Basil I
- Mother: Eudokia Ingerina

Alexander (Note: Alexander is most commonly not assigned a regnal number. If assigned one, he is rarely regarded as Alexander II, after Severus Alexander (r. 222–235) or even more rarely as Alexander III after both Severus Alexander and Domitius Alexander (r. 308–310). He has also been called Alexander I.) (Greek: Άλέξανδρος, romanized: Aléxandros, 23 November 870 – 6 June 913) was briefly Byzantine emperor from 912 to 913, and the third emperor of the Macedonian dynasty.

== Life ==
Born in the purple, Alexander was the third son of Emperor Basil I and Eudokia Ingerina. Unlike his older brother Leo VI the Wise, his paternity was not disputed between Basil I and Michael III because he was born years after Michael's death. As a child, Alexander was crowned as co-emperor by his father in early 879, following the death of Basil's son Constantine.

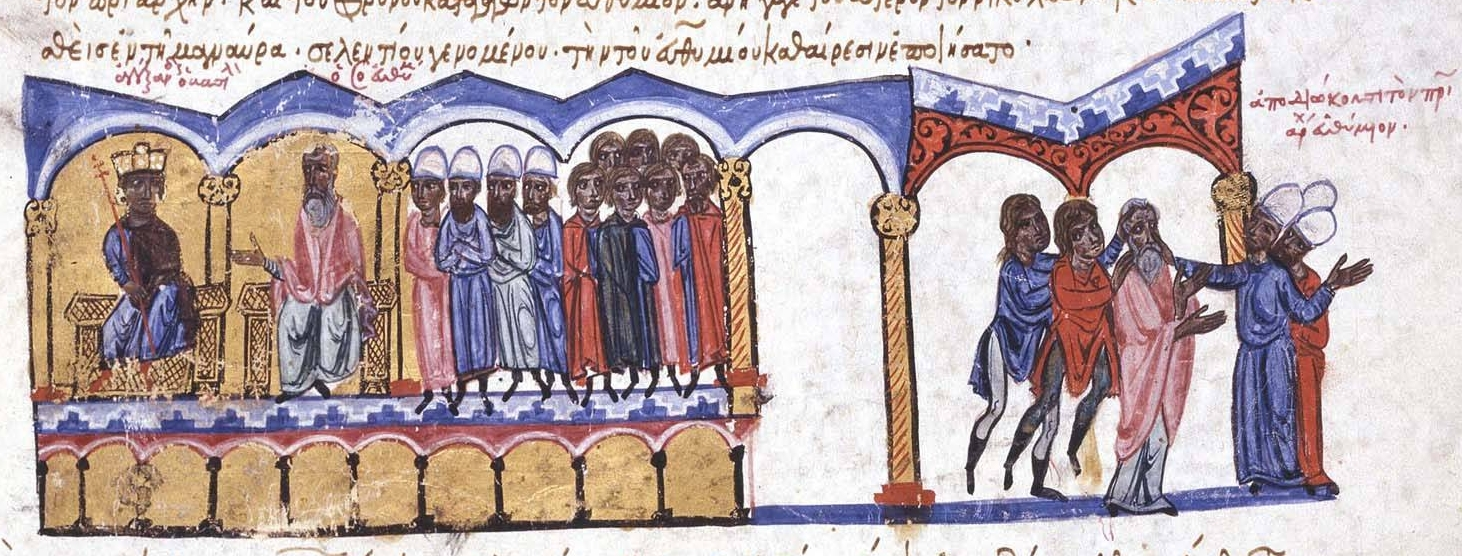
Alexander ordering the dismissal of Patriarch Euthymius.

Upon the death of his brother Leo on 11 May 912, Alexander succeeded as senior emperor alongside Leo's young son Constantine VII. He was the first Byzantine emperor to use the term "autocrator" (αὐτοκράτωρ πιστὸς εὑσεβὴς βασιλεὺς) on coinage to celebrate the ending of his thirty-three years as co-emperor. Alexander promptly dismissed most of Leo's advisers and appointees, including the admiral Himerios, the patriarch Euthymios, and the empress Zoe Karbonopsina, the mother of Constantine VII, whom he locked up in a nunnery. The patriarchate was again conferred on Nicholas Mystikos, who had been removed from this position due to his opposition to Leo's fourth marriage.

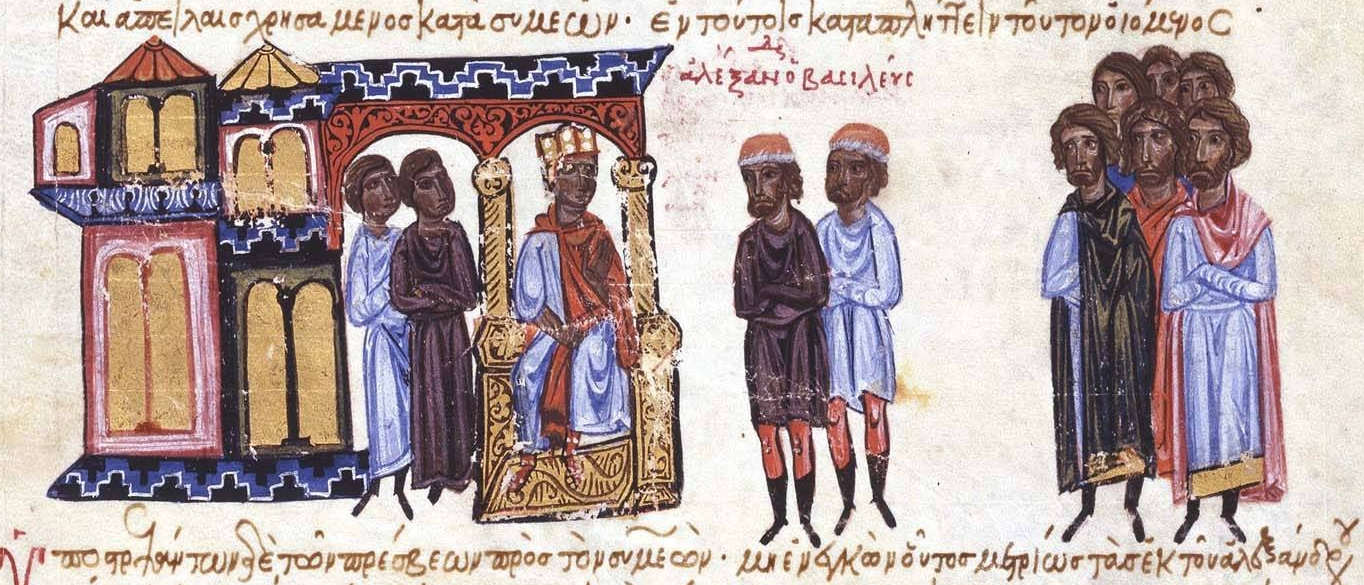
Emperor Alexander rebuffs the Bulgarian envoys, refusing to pay tribute.

During his short reign, Alexander found himself attacked by the forces of Al-Muqtadir of the Abbasid Caliphate in the east, and provoked a war with Simeon I of Bulgaria by refusing to send the traditional tribute on his accession. Alexander died soon after, allegedly from a stomach disease caused by excessive eating and alcohol.

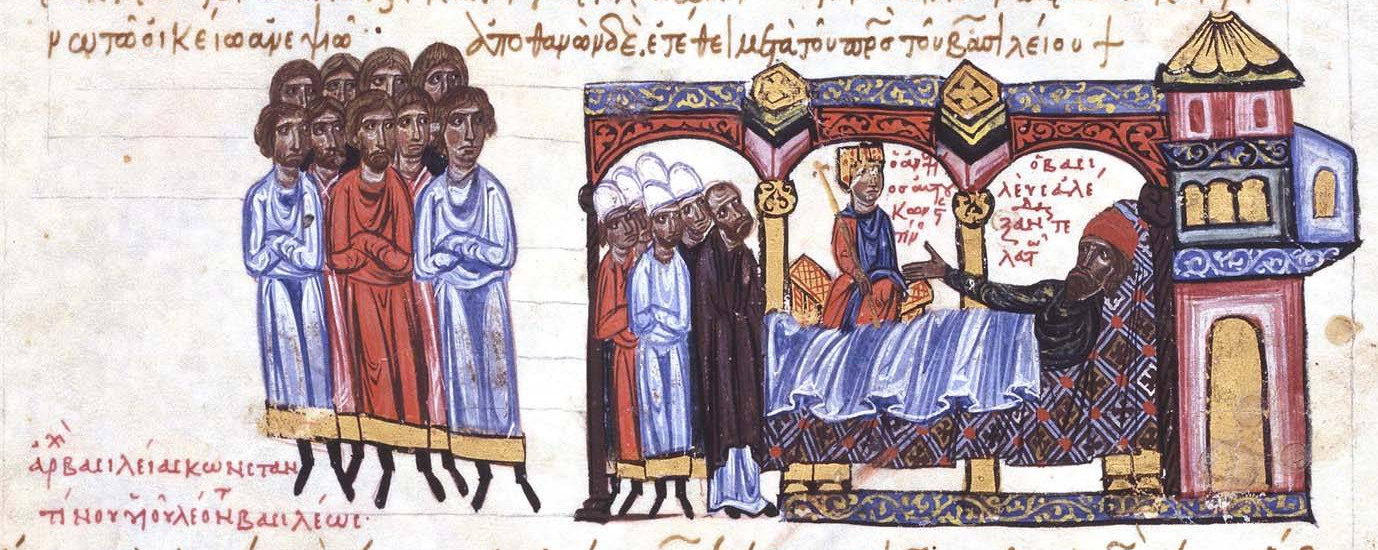
On his deathbed, Alexander finally concedes power to his nephew Constantine VII.

The sources are uniformly hostile towards Alexander, who is depicted as lazy, lecherous, drunk, and malignant; they also accuse him of idolatry, including making pagan sacrifices to the golden statue of a boar in the Hippodrome, and providing it with new teeth and genitals, in hope of curing his impotence. It was his rumored intention to castrate the young Constantine VII in order to exclude him from the succession. This did not happen, but Alexander did leave Constantine a hostile regent (Nicholas Mystikos) and the beginning of a long war against Bulgaria.

== See also ==
- List of Byzantine emperors

== Notes ==
Alexander Macedonian dynasty Born: 870 Died: 6 June 913
Regnal titles
Preceded by Leo VI	Byzantine emperor 11 May 912 – 6 June 913	Succeeded by Constantine VII
