= Constantine Maniakes =

Byzantine court official

Constantine Maniakes (Greek: Κωνσταντῖνος Μανιάκης; fl. ca. 830–866) was a senior Byzantine court official of the mid-9th century.

== Biography ==
Maniakes was probably descended from a noble Armenian family. He came to the Byzantine court in the reign of Emperor Theophilos (r. 829–842), as a member of a delegation from the Armenian princes, and was left in the Byzantine capital, Constantinople, as a hostage. His intelligence and physical qualities soon marked him out, and he quickly won the confidence of Theophilos and rose in the court hierarchy. By the end of Theophilos's reign, he was droungarios of the Watch. He retained this post after Theophilos's death, and it was he who in 843 enforced the deposition of Patriarch John VII Grammatikos, who later falsely accused Maniakes of torturing him.

His influence in the imperial court was high during the regency of Empress Theodora and Theoktistos, as well as after, during the sole reign of Michael III (r. 842–867). He eventually rose to the rank of patrikios and the post of logothetes tou dromou ("Postal Logothete", effectively foreign minister), the latter in 866–867 according to Rodolphe Guilland. After Theoktistos's fall in 855, engineered by Theodora's brother Bardas, Maniakes tried in vain to save Theoktistos from execution. Maniakes was one of the sponsors of Basil the Macedonian, who later became emperor (r. 867–886), during his early days in the imperial court. According to Genesios and other Byzantine chroniclers, Maniakes was related to the future emperor, who was of partial Armenian descent. Maniakes was also a firm opponent of Patriarch Photios and consequently a friend and ally of Photios's rival Ignatios, even aiding him during the latter's imprisonment at Bardas's orders. During the murder of Bardas by Basil the Macedonian in April 866, Constantine protected Michael III through the subsequent tumult. He was one of Michael III's partners in the emperor's favourite pastime, chariot racing, and is last mentioned in the races held on 1 September 866 in the hippodrome of the Saint Mamas Palace.

== Family ==
Traditionally, Constantine Maniakes has been identified with the father of Thomas, a patrikios and logothetes in the early 10th century, and as the father or grandfather of the historian Genesios, but more recent research by Patricia Karlin-Hayter and Tadeusz Wasilewski has undermined this hypothesis.

== Sources ==
- Guilland, Rodolphe (1967). "Le Drongaire et le Grand drongaire de la Veille". Recherches sur les institutions byzantines, Tome I (in French). Berlin: Akademie-Verlag. pp. 563–587.
- Winkelmann, Friedhelm; Lilie, Ralph-Johannes; et al. (2000). "Konstantinos Maniakes (# 3962)". Prosopographie der mittelbyzantinischen Zeit: I. Abteilung (641–867), 2. Band: Georgios (# 2183) – Leon (# 4270) (in German). Walter de Gruyter. pp. 577–579. ISBN 978-3-11-016672-9.
