= Symeon Logothete =

Byzantine Greek historian and poet

Symeon Logothete (or Symeon Magister) was a 10th-century Byzantine Greek historian and poet.

The identification of Symeon Logothete with the near-contemporary hagiographer Symeon Metaphrastes is far from certain.

== Chronicle ==
Symeon wrote a world chronicle that goes from Creation to the year 948. It has been misattributed to one Theodosius Melissenus (Theodosius of Melitene) and also to Leo Grammaticus (Leo the Grammarian), who was in fact merely the scribe of a copy from 1013. Its original full title is On the Creation of the World from the Time of Genesis, and a Chronicle after That, Compiled by Symeon the Magister and Logothete from Various Chronicles and Histories. The first part down to the reign of Justinian II (r. 685–695, 705–711) is based on an epitome of another chronicle. The second part down to 842 is closely related to the work of George Hamartolos. The third, covering the years 842–948, is the original work of Symeon. It can be divided into three distinct sections, each written in a different style: the reigns of Michael III (842–867) and Basil I (867–886); the reigns of Leo VI (886–912) and Alexander (912–913); and his personal recollections of the period 913–948.

The chronicle survives in three redactions: the original version, with a favourable view of the reign of Romanos Lekapenos (919–944); the version that serves as a continuation of George Hamartolos and at one time had its own continuation down to 963; and the version contained in the chronicle of Pseudo-Symeon. It also survives in a Church Slavonic translation. There are other continuations of the original beyond 948 besides the one that was attached to the continuation of George Hamartolos. That continuation was probably composed in the circle of the Phokas family.

== Poetry ==
Symeon wrote a dirge on the death of the Emperor Constantine VII (959) and a poem on the death of Stephen Lekapenos (963). He had probably finished his chronicle by this time. Manuscript copies of the dirge to Constantine refer to Symeon with the titles magistros and logothetes tou stratiotikou. There is a collection of letters attributed to Symeon, magistros, logothetes tou dromou and former protasekretis. It cannot be dated precisely. Internal references may indicate a late 10th-century origin. Some accompanying letters of Patriarch Nicholas Mystikos (901–925) may indicate a date earlier in the century. It is not certain, therefore, that the author of the letters is the same as the author of the chronicle. Taken all together the evidence is consistent with the historian, poet and letter-writer being the same person as the Symeon who was promoted to magistros and logothetes by Nikephoros II Phokas (963–969) and then to logothetes tou dromou by John I Tzimiskes (969–976).

== Editions ==
- Sullivan, Denis, ed. (2018). The Rise and Fall of Nikephoros II Phokas: Five Contemporary Texts in Annotated Translations. Brill.
- Wahlgren, Staffan, ed. (2006). Symeonis Magistri et Logothetae Chronicon. Walter de Gruyter.
- Wahlgren, Staffan, ed. (2019). The Chronicle of the Logothete. Liverpool University Press.

== Bibliography ==
- Kazhdan, Alexander (1991). "Symeon Logothete". In Kazhdan, Alexander (ed.). The Oxford Dictionary of Byzantium. Oxford and New York: Oxford University Press. ISBN 0-19-504652-8.
- Neville, Leonora (2018). Guide to Byzantine Historical Writing. Cambridge University Press. doi:10.1017/9781139626880.
- Treadgold, Warren (1979). "The Chronological Accuracy of the Chronicle of Symeon the Logothete for the Years 813–845". Dumbarton Oaks Papers. 33: 157–197. JSTOR 1291437.
- Treadgold, Warren (2013). The Middle Byzantine Historians. Palgrave Macmillan. doi:10.1057/9781137280862.
- Wahlgren, Staffan (2001). "Symeon the Logothete: Some Philological Remarks". Byzantion. 71 (1): 251–262. JSTOR 44172551.
