= Theophanes Continuatus =

Collection of books on the history of the Byzantine Empire

Theophanes Continuatus (Greek: συνεχισταί Θεοφάνους) or Scriptores post Theophanem (Οἱ μετὰ Θεοφάνην, "those after Theophanes") is the Latin name commonly applied to a collection of historical writings preserved in the 11th-century Vat. gr. 167 manuscript. Its name derives from its role as the continuation, covering the years 813–961, of the Chronicle of Theophanes the Confessor, which reaches from 285 to 813. The manuscript consists of four distinct works, in style and form very unlike the annalistic approach of Theophanes.

The first work, of four books consists of a series of biographies of the emperors reigning from 813 to 867 (from Leo the Armenian to Michael III). As they were commissioned by Emperor Constantine VII (r. 913–959), they reflect the point of view of the reigning Macedonian dynasty. The unknown author probably used the same sources as Genesios. The second work is known as the Vita Basilii (Latin for "Life of Basil"), a biography of Basil I the Macedonian (r. 867–886) written by his grandson Constantine VII probably around 950. The work is essentially a panegyric, praising Basil and his reign while vilifying his predecessor, Michael III. The third work is a history of the years 886–948, in form and content very close to the history of Symeon Logothetes, and the final section continues it until 961. It was probably written by Theodore Daphnopates, shortly before 963.
