= Symeon the Metaphrast =

10th-century Byzantine historian and hagiographer

Saint Symeon the Metaphrast
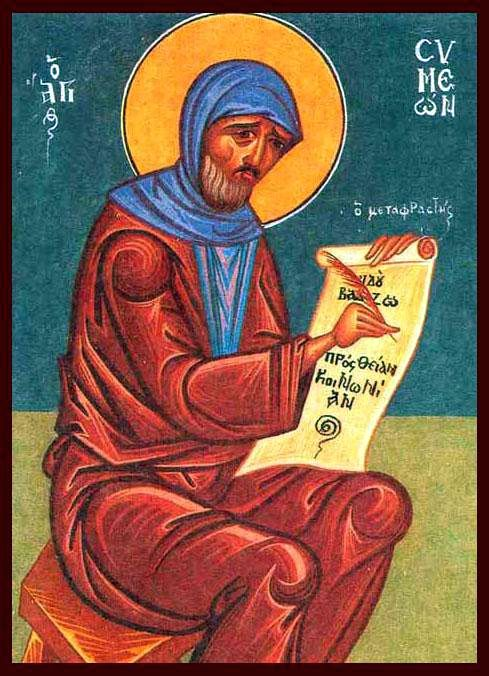

Venerable, Hagiographer, Logothete
- Born: 886-912 (900); Constantinople (modern-day Istanbul, Turkey)
- Residence: Constantinople
- Died: November 28, 987; Constantinople
- Honored in: Eastern Orthodox Church
- Canonized: 11th century, Constantinople by Eastern Orthodox Church
- Feast: November 9/November 28
- Attributes: Pen, Scroll, Religious habit
- Major works: Menologium

Symeon or Simeon (died c. 1000), distinguished as Symeon Metaphrastes (Latin) or Symeon the Metaphrast (Ancient Greek: Συμεών ὁ Μεταφραστής, Symeṓn ho Metaphrastḗs), was a Byzantine writer and official regarded as a saint in the Eastern Orthodox Church. His feast day is celebrated on 9 or 28 November. He is best known for his 10-volume Greek menologion, a collection of saints' lives.

== Life ==
About Symeon's life few details are known. He lived in the second half of the 10th century. Ephrem Mtsire puts him at the peak of his career in the sixth year of Basil II (982). Yahya of Antioch also makes him a contemporary of Basil II and Patriarch Nicholas II of Constantinople (984–991). In the 15th century, Mark Eugenikos wrongly called Symeon a megas logothetes. The hagiographer actually lived a generation later than the historian Symeon Logothete.

== Works ==
Symeon wrote mainly hymnody and hagiography. He composed kanones, stichera and a hymn to the Trinity. He also compiled excerpts of the Church Fathers, particularly Basil the Great. His most important work by far, however, is the menologion, which Albert Ehrhard labelled "a revolution in the field of hagiography". According to tradition, it was commissioned by Basil II.

Symeon's menologion is a product of the encyclopedism characteristic of the Macedonian Renaissance. He did not merely collect and arrange pre-existing saint's lives, but also reworked them, standardizing their language and embellishing their rhetorical style to bring them in line with the Atticism of the day. His nickname comes from this act of metaphrasis. The content of the lives was not altered, however, and historical errors were left intact. Symeon arranged them according to their feast days in the Eastern Orthodox liturgical calendar. There are about 150 distinct lives.

For his menologion, Symeon received praise from Nikephoros Ouranos and Michael Psellos addressed to him an encomium. It was widely read in monasteries. The standard edition came in ten volumes. Numerous illuminated copies were produced in the 11th century. Working independently, Father Delehaye and Albert Ehrhard compiled works attributed to Symeon. They were at a loss for the provenance of some of his materials and their relation to other standard hagiographies. In particular, Delehaye found that Symeon or his immediate sources sparsely added materials of their own drawn from other places.

Some orthodox prayers of preparation before Holy Communion and prayers of thanksgiving after Holy Communion were composed by him.

== Veneration ==
Venerable Symeon the Metaphrast is venerated in the Eastern Orthodox Church. Michael Psellos compiled Symeon's biography (c. 1050) and he composed a liturgical office for him.
