= Joseph Genesius =

Genesius (Greek: Γενέσιος, Genesios; Armenian: Հովսեփ Գենեսիուս) is the conventional name given to the anonymous Byzantine author of Armenian origin of the tenth century chronicle, On the reign of the emperors. His first name is sometimes given as Joseph, combining him with a "Joseph Genesius" quoted in the preamble to John Skylitzes. Traditionally, he has been regarded as the son or grandson of Constantine Maniakes.

Composed at the court of Constantine VII, the chronicle opens in 814, covers the Second Iconoclast period and ends in 886. It presents the events largely from the view of the Macedonian dynasty, though with a skew less marked than the authors of Theophanes Continuatus, a collection of mostly anonymous chronicles meant to continue the work of Theophanes the Confessor.

The chronicle describes the reigns of the four emperors from Leo V down to Michael III in detail; and more briefly that of Basil I. It uses Constantine VII's Life of Basil as a source, though it appears to have been finished before Theophanes Continuatus, and gives information present in neither Continuatus nor Skylitzes.

== Modern editions ==
English

- Genesios, Joseph, A. Kaldellis. (trans.) On the reigns of the emperors. Byzantina Australiensia, 11. Canberra: Australian Association for Byzantine Studies, 1998. ISBN 0-9593626-9-X.

Greek

- A. Lesmüller-Werner, and H. Thurn, Corpus Fontium Historiae Byzantinae, Vol. XIV, Series Berolinensis. Berlin: De Gruyter, 1973. ISSN 0589-8048.
