= July 27 =

July 27 this year in various calendars
- Monday, 27 July 2026
Akan	Monodwo
Armenian	7 Nawasardi 1476
Aztec	Quecholli 18, 4 Miquiztli
Babylonian	12 Du'uzu, 2337 SE
Balinese pawukon	Menga, Kajeng, Menala, Keliwon, Maulu, Coma of Krulut, Uma, Gigis, Suka
Bengali	12 Shrabon, BS 1433
Chinese	Yang Water Tiger・Heart Mansion; Fire Horse Year, Month 6, Day 14 (Dashu, 11 days until Liqiu)
Common Era	27 July 2026 CE
Coptic	20 Epip, AM 1742
Egyptian	12 Choiak, 2775 NE
Ethiopian	20 Ḥamlē, 2018 Amätä Məhrät
French Republican	Décade I, Nonidi de Thermidor de l'Année 234 de la République
Gregorian	27 July, AD 2026
Hebrew	13 Av, AM 5786
Hindu	Mūla・Vaidhṛti; Solar: 11 Śrāvaṇa, 1948 SE; Lunisolar: Trayodaśī, Śukla pakṣa of Āṣāḍha, 2083 VE; Rāudra・5127 KY・1,872,783
Icelandic	Mánudagur, 2 Heyannir 2026
Islamic	11 Safar, AH 1448 (using tabular method)
ISO week date	2026-W31-1
Japanese	14 Minazuki, Reiwa 8 (Taisho, 11 days until Risshū)
Julian	14 July, AD 2026 (AM 7534)
Julian day	2461249
Korean	14 Yangdal, 4359 DE
Maya	13.0.13.14.6; 19 Xul, 4 Cimi
Roman	Pridie Idus Iulias, MMDCCLXXIX AUC
Solar Hijri	5 Mordad, SH 1405
Tibetan	13 chu stod, me pho rta 2153 or 1772 or 1000

<<	July					>>
Su	Mo	Tu	We	Th	Fr	Sa
			1	2	3	4
5	6	7	8	9	10	11
12	13	14	15	16	17	18
19	20	21	22	23	24	25
26	27	28	29	30	31
2026

July 27 in recent years
2026 (Monday)
2025 (Sunday)
2024 (Saturday)
2023 (Thursday)
2022 (Wednesday)
2021 (Tuesday)
2020 (Monday)
2019 (Saturday)
2018 (Friday)
2017 (Thursday)

July 27 is the 208th day of the year (209th in leap years) in the Gregorian calendar; 157 days remain until the end of the year.

== Events ==
=== Pre-1600 ===
- 1054 – Siward, Earl of Northumbria, invades Scotland and defeats Macbeth, King of Scotland, somewhere north of the Firth of Forth. This is known as the Battle of Dunsinane.
- 1189 – Friedrich Barbarossa arrives at Niš, the capital of Serbian King Stefan Nemanja, during the Third Crusade.
- 1202 – Georgian–Seljuk wars: At the Battle of Basian the Kingdom of Georgia defeats the Sultanate of Rum.
- 1214 – Battle of Bouvines: Philip II of France decisively defeats Imperial, English and Flemish armies, effectively ending John of England's Angevin Empire.
- 1299 – According to Edward Gibbon, Osman I invades the territory of Nicomedia for the first time, usually considered to be the founding day of the Ottoman state.
- 1302 – Battle of Bapheus: Decisive Ottoman victory over the Byzantines opening up Bithynia for Turkish conquest.
- 1549 – The Jesuit priest Francis Xavier's ship reaches Japan.

=== 1601–1900 ===
- 1663 – The English Parliament passes the second Navigation Act requiring that all goods bound for the American colonies have to be sent in English ships from English ports. After the Acts of Union 1707, Scotland would be included in the Act.
- 1689 – Glorious Revolution: The Battle of Killiecrankie is a victory for the Jacobites.
- 1694 – A Royal charter is granted to the Bank of England.
- 1714 – The Great Northern War: The first significant victory of the Russian Navy in the naval battle of Gangut against the Swedish Navy near the Hanko Peninsula.
- 1775 – Founding of the U.S. Army Medical Department: The Second Continental Congress passes legislation establishing "an hospital for an army consisting of 20,000 men."
- 1778 – American Revolution: First Battle of Ushant: British and French fleets fight to a standoff.
- 1789 – The first U.S. federal government agency, the Department of Foreign Affairs, is established (it will be later renamed Department of State).
- 1794 – French Revolution: Maximilien Robespierre is arrested after encouraging the execution of more than 17,000 "enemies of the Revolution".
- 1816 – Seminole Wars: The Battle of Negro Fort ends when a hot shot cannonball fired by US Navy Gunboat No. 154 explodes the fort's Powder Magazine, killing approximately 275. It is considered the deadliest single cannon shot in US history.
- 1857 – Indian Rebellion: Sixty-eight men hold out for eight days against a force of 2,500 to 3,000 mutinying sepoys and 8,000 irregular forces.
- 1865 – Welsh settlers arrive at Chubut in Argentina.
- 1866 – The first permanent transatlantic telegraph cable is successfully completed, stretching from Valentia Island, Ireland, to Heart's Content, Newfoundland.
- 1880 – Second Anglo-Afghan War: Battle of Maiwand: Afghan forces led by Mohammad Ayub Khan defeat the British Army in battle near Maiwand, Afghanistan.
- 1890 – Vincent van Gogh shoots himself and dies two days later.
- 1900 – Kaiser Wilhelm II makes a speech comparing Germans to Huns; for years afterwards, "Hun" would be a disparaging name for Germans.

=== 1901–present ===
- 1917 – World War I: The Allies reach the Yser Canal at the Battle of Passchendaele.
- 1919 – The Chicago Race Riot erupts after a racial incident occurred on a South Side beach, leading to 38 fatalities and 537 injuries over a five-day period.
- 1921 – Researchers at the University of Toronto, led by biochemist Frederick Banting, prove that the hormone insulin regulates blood sugar.
- 1929 – The Geneva Convention of 1929, dealing with treatment of prisoners-of-war, is signed by 53 nations.
- 1940 – The animated short A Wild Hare is released, introducing the character of Bugs Bunny.
- 1942 – World War II: Allied forces successfully halt the final Axis advance into Egypt.
- 1947 – In Vatican City, Rome, canonization of Catherine Labouré, the saint whose apparitions of the Virgin Mary originated the worldwide distribution of the Miraculous Medal.
- 1949 – Initial flight of the de Havilland Comet, the first jet-powered airliner.
- 1953 – Korean War: Cessation of hostilities is achieved when the United States, China, and North Korea sign an armistice agreement. Syngman Rhee, President of South Korea, refuses to sign but pledges to observe the armistice.
- 1955 – The Austrian State Treaty restores Austrian sovereignty.
- 1955 – El Al Flight 402 is shot down by two fighter jets after straying into Bulgarian air space. All 58 people on board are killed.
- 1959 – The Continental League is announced as baseball's "third major league" in the United States.
- 1963 – The Puijo observation tower is opened to the general public at Puijo Hill in Kuopio, Finland.
- 1964 – Vietnam War: Five thousand more American military advisers are sent to South Vietnam bringing the total number of United States forces in Vietnam to 21,000.
- 1974 – Watergate scandal: The House of Representatives Judiciary Committee votes 27 to 11 to recommend the first article of impeachment (for obstruction of justice) against President Richard Nixon.
- 1975 – Mayor of Jaffna and former MP Alfred Duraiappah is shot dead.
- 1981 – While landing at Chihuahua International Airport, Aeromexico Flight 230 overshoots the runway. Thirty-two of the 66 passengers and crew on board the DC-9 are killed.
- 1983 – Black July: Eighteen Tamil political prisoners at the Welikada high security prison in Colombo are massacred by Sinhalese prisoners, the second such massacre in two days.
- 1989 – While attempting to land at Tripoli International Airport in Libya, Korean Air Flight 803 crashes just short of the runway. Seventy-five of the 199 passengers and crew and four people on the ground are killed, in the second accident involving a DC-10 in less than two weeks, the first being United Airlines Flight 232.
- 1990 – The Jamaat al Muslimeen attempt a coup d'état in Trinidad and Tobago.
- 1995 – The Korean War Veterans Memorial is dedicated in Washington, D.C.
- 1996 – In Atlanta, United States, a pipe bomb explodes at Centennial Olympic Park during the 1996 Summer Olympics.
- 1997 – About 50 people are killed in the Si Zerrouk massacre in Algeria.
- 2002 – Ukraine airshow disaster: A Sukhoi Su-27 fighter crashes during an air show at Lviv, Ukraine killing 77 and injuring more than 500 others, making it the deadliest air show disaster in history.
- 2015 – Seven people are killed and many injured after gunmen attack an Indian police station in Punjab.

== Births ==
=== Pre-1600 ===
- 774 – Kūkai, Japanese Buddhist monk, founder of Esoteric (Shingon) Buddhism (died 835)
- 1452 – Ludovico Sforza, Italian son of Francesco I Sforza (died 1508)
- 1452 – Lucrezia Crivelli, mistress of Ludovico Sforza (died 1508)
- 1502 – Francesco Corteccia, Italian composer (died 1571)
- 1578 – Frances Howard, Duchess of Richmond (died 1639)

=== 1601–1900 ===
- 1612 – Murad IV, Ottoman Sultan (died 1640)
- 1625 – Edward Montagu, 1st Earl of Sandwich (died 1672)
- 1733 – Jeremiah Dixon, English surveyor and astronomer (died 1779)
- 1740 – Jeanne Baret, French explorer (died 1803)
- 1741 – François-Hippolyte Barthélémon, French-English violinist and composer (died 1808)
- 1752 – Samuel Smith, American general and politician (died 1839)
- 1768 – Charlotte Corday, French assassin of Jean-Paul Marat (died 1793)
- 1768 – Joseph Anton Koch, Austrian painter (died 1839)
- 1773 – Jacob Aall, Norwegian economist and politician (died 1844)
- 1777 – Thomas Campbell, Scottish-French poet and academic (died 1844)
- 1777 – Henry Trevor, 21st Baron Dacre, English general (died 1853)
- 1781 – Mauro Giuliani, Italian singer-songwriter and guitarist (died 1828)
- 1784 – Denis Davydov, Russian general and poet (died 1839)
- 1801 – George Biddell Airy, English mathematician and 7th Astronomer Royal (died 1892)
- 1812 – Thomas L. Clingman, American general and politician (died 1897)
- 1818 – Agostino Roscelli, Italian priest and saint (died 1902)
- 1824 – Alexandre Dumas, fils, French novelist and playwright (died 1895)
- 1833 – Thomas George Bonney, English geologist, mountaineer, and academic (died 1923)
- 1834 – Miguel Grau Seminario, Peruvian admiral (died 1879)
- 1835 – Giosuè Carducci, Italian poet and educator, Nobel Prize laureate (died 1907)
- 1848 – Loránd Eötvös, Hungarian physicist and politician, Minister of Education of Hungary (died 1919)
- 1848 – Friedrich Ernst Dorn, German physicist (died 1916)
- 1853 – Vladimir Korolenko, Ukrainian journalist, author, and activist (died 1921)
- 1853 – Elizabeth Plankinton, American philanthropist (died 1923)
- 1854 – Takahashi Korekiyo, Japanese accountant and politician, 20th Prime Minister of Japan (died 1936)
- 1857 – José Celso Barbosa, Puerto Rican physician, sociologist, and politician (died 1921)
- 1857 – E. A. Wallis Budge, English Egyptologist, Orientalist, and philologist (died 1934)
- 1858 – George Lyon, Canadian golfer and cricketer (died 1938)
- 1866 – António José de Almeida, Portuguese physician and politician, 6th President of Portugal (died 1929)
- 1867 – Enrique Granados, Spanish pianist and composer (died 1916)
- 1870 – Hilaire Belloc, French-born British writer and historian (died 1953)
- 1872 – Stanislav Binički, Serbian composer, conductor, and pedagogue. (died 1942)
- 1879 – Francesco Gaeta, Italian poet (died 1927)
- 1877 – Ernő Dohnányi, Hungarian pianist, composer, and conductor (died 1960)
- 1879 – Jack Laviolette, Canadian ice hockey player, coach and manager (died 1960)
- 1880 – Joe Tinker, American baseball player (died 1948)
- 1881 – Hans Fischer, German chemist and academic, Nobel Prize laureate (died 1945)
- 1882 – Geoffrey de Havilland, English pilot and engineer, founded the de Havilland Aircraft Company (died 1965)
- 1886 – Ernst May, German architect and urban planner (died 1970)
- 1889 – Vera Karalli, Russian ballerina, choreographer, and actress (died 1972)
- 1890 – Benjamin Miessner, American radio engineer and inventor (died 1976)
- 1890 – Armas Taipale, Finnish discus thrower and shot putter (died 1976)
- 1891 – Jacob van der Hoeden, Dutch-Israeli veterinarian and academic (died 1968)
- 1891 – Ruby McKim, American quilter (died 1976)
- 1893 – Ugo Agostoni, Italian cyclist (died 1941)
- 1894 – Mientje Kling, Dutch actress (died 1966)
- 1896 – Robert George, Scottish air marshal and politician, 24th Governor of South Australia (died 1967)
- 1896 – Henri Longchambon, French lawyer and politician (died 1969)
- 1897 – Biz Mackey, American baseball player (died 1965)
- 1899 – Percy Hornibrook, Australian cricketer (died 1976)

=== 1901–present ===
- 1902 – Yaroslav Halan, Ukrainian playwright and publicist (died 1949)
- 1903 – Nikolay Cherkasov, Russian actor (died 1966)
- 1903 – Michail Stasinopoulos, Greek jurist and politician, President of Greece (died 2002)
- 1903 – Mārtiņš Zīverts, Latvian playwright (died 1990)
- 1904 – Lyudmila Rudenko, Soviet chess player (died 1986)
- 1905 – Leo Durocher, American baseball player and manager (died 1991)
- 1906 – Jerzy Giedroyc, Polish author and activist (died 2000)
- 1906 – Herbert Jasper, Canadian psychologist and neurologist (died 1999)
- 1907 – Ross Alexander, American stage and film actor (died 1937)
- 1907 – Carl McClellan Hill, American educator and academic administrator (died 1995)
- 1907 – Irene Fischer, Austrian-American geodesist and mathematician (died 2009)
- 1908 – Joseph Mitchell, American journalist and author (died 1996)
- 1910 – Julien Gracq, French author and critic (died 2007)
- 1910 – Lupita Tovar, Mexican-American actress (died 2016)
- 1911 – Rayner Heppenstall, English author and poet (died 1981)
- 1912 – Vernon Elliott, English bassoon player, composer, and conductor (died 1996)
- 1913 – George L. Street III, American Navy captain, Medal of Honor recipient (died 2000)
- 1914 – August Sang, Estonian poet and translator (died 1969)
- 1915 – Mario Del Monaco, Italian tenor (died 1982)
- 1915 – Josef Priller, German colonel and pilot (died 1961)
- 1916 – Elizabeth Hardwick, American literary critic, novelist, and short story writer (died 2007)
- 1916 – Skippy Williams, American saxophonist and arranger (died 1994)
- 1916 – Keenan Wynn, American actor (died 1986)
- 1918 – Leonard Rose, American cellist and educator (died 1984)
- 1920 – Henry D. "Homer" Haynes, American comedian and musician (died 1971)
- 1921 – Garry Davis, American pilot and activist, created the World Passport (died 2013)
- 1921 – Émile Genest, Canadian-American actor (died 2003)
- 1922 – Adolfo Celi, Italian actor, director, and screenwriter (died 1986)
- 1922 – Norman Lear, American screenwriter and producer (died 2023)
- 1923 – Mas Oyama, South Korean-Japanese martial artist (died 1994)
- 1923 – Ray Boone, American baseball player (died 2004)
- 1924 – Vincent Canby, American historian and critic (died 2000)
- 1924 – Otar Taktakishvili, Georgian composer and conductor (died 1989)
- 1927 – Guy Carawan, American singer and musicologist (died 2015)
- 1927 – Pierre Granier-Deferre, French director and screenwriter (died 2007)
- 1927 – Will Jordan, American comedian and actor (died 2018)
- 1927 – C. Rajadurai, Sri Lankan journalist and politician, 1st Mayor of Batticaloa (died 2025)
- 1927 – John Seigenthaler, American journalist and academic (died 2014)
- 1928 – Joseph Kittinger, American colonel and pilot (died 2022)
- 1929 – Jean Baudrillard, French sociologist and philosopher (died 2007)
- 1929 – Harvey Fuqua, American singer-songwriter and producer (died 2010)
- 1929 – Jack Higgins, English author and academic (died 2022)
- 1929 – Marc Wilkinson, French-Australian composer and conductor (died 2022)
- 1930 – Joy Whitby, English director, producer, and screenwriter
- 1930 – Shirley Williams, English academic and politician, Secretary of State for Education (died 2021)
- 1931 – Khieu Samphan, Cambodian academic and politician, 28th Prime Minister of Cambodia
- 1931 – Jerry Van Dyke, American actor (died 2018)
- 1932 – Forest Able, American basketball player (died 2026)
- 1933 – Nick Reynolds, American singer and bongo player (died 2008)
- 1933 – Ted Whitten, Australian football player and journalist (died 1995)
- 1935 – Hillar Kärner, Estonian chess player (died 2017)
- 1935 – Billy McCullough, Northern Irish footballer (died 2026)
- 1936 – J. Robert Hooper, American businessman and politician (died 2008)
- 1937 – Anna Dawson, English actress and singer (died 2026)
- 1937 – Don Galloway, American actor (died 2009)
- 1937 – Robert Holmes à Court, South African-Australian businessman and lawyer (died 1990)
- 1938 – Pierre Christin, French comics creator and writer (died 2024)
- 1938 – Gary Gygax, American game designer, co-created Dungeons & Dragons (died 2008)
- 1939 – William Eggleston, American photographer and academic
- 1939 – Michael Longley, Northern Irish poet and academic (died 2025)
- 1939 – Paulo Silvino, Brazilian comedian, composer and actor (died 2017)
- 1940 – Pina Bausch, German dancer and choreographer (died 2009)
- 1941 – Christian Boesch, Austrian opera singer
- 1941 – Johannes Fritsch, German viola player and composer (died 2010)
- 1942 – Édith Butler, Canadian singer-songwriter
- 1942 – Bobbie Gentry, American singer-songwriter and guitarist
- 1942 – John Pleshette, American actor, director, and screenwriter
- 1942 – Dennis Ralston, American tennis player (died 2020)
- 1943 – Jeremy Greenstock, English diplomat, British Ambassador to the United Nations
- 1944 – Jean-Marie Leblanc, French cyclist and journalist
- 1944 – Barbara Thomson, English saxophonist and composer (died 2022)
- 1944 – Vito D'Amato, Italian footballer (died 2025)
- 1946 – Peter Reading, English poet and author (died 2011)
- 1947 – Mack Calvin, American basketball player
- 1947 – Sliman Mansour, Palestinian painter and sculptor (died 2026)
- 1947 – Kazuyoshi Miura, Japanese businessman (died 2008)
- 1947 – Giora Spiegel, Israeli footballer and coach
- 1947 – Betty Thomas, American actress, director, and producer
- 1948 – Peggy Fleming, American figure skater and sportscaster
- 1948 – James Munby, English lawyer and judge
- 1948 – Henny Vrienten, Dutch singer-songwriter and bass player (died 2022)
- 1949 – Maury Chaykin, American-Canadian actor (died 2010)
- 1949 – André Dupont, Canadian ice hockey player and coach
- 1949 – Rory MacDonald, Scottish singer-songwriter and bass player
- 1949 – Maureen McGovern, American singer and actress
- 1949 – Robert Rankin, English author and illustrator
- 1950 – Simon Jones, English actor
- 1951 – Roseanna Cunningham, Scottish lawyer and politician, Minister for Community Safety and Legal Affairs
- 1951 – Bob Diamond, American-English banker and businessman
- 1951 – Rolf Thung, Dutch tennis player
- 1952 – Marvin Barnes, American basketball player (died 2014)
- 1952 – Roxanne Hart, American actress
- 1953 – Chung Dong-young, South Korean journalist and politician, 31st South Korean Minister of Unification
- 1953 – Yahoo Serious, Australian actor, director, producer, and screenwriter
- 1954 – Philippe Alliot, French race car driver and sportscaster
- 1954 – G. S. Bali, Indian lawyer and politician (died 2021)
- 1954 – Mark Stanway, English keyboard player
- 1954 – Ricardo Uceda, Peruvian journalist and author
- 1955 – Cat Bauer, American journalist, author, and playwright
- 1955 – Allan Border, Australian cricketer and coach
- 1955 – John Howell, English journalist and politician
- 1955 – Bobby Rondinelli, American drummer
- 1956 – Carol Leifer, American actress, comedian, screenwriter, and producer
- 1957 – Bill Engvall, American comedian, actor, and producer
- 1958 – Christopher Dean, English figure skater and choreographer
- 1958 – Kimmo Hakola, Finnish composer
- 1959 – Joe DeSa, American baseball player (died 1986)
- 1959 – Hugh Green, American football player
- 1959 – Neil King Jr., American journalist and author (died 2024)
- 1959 – Yiannos Papantoniou, French-Greek economist and politician, Greek Minister of National Defence
- 1960 – Jo Durie, English tennis player and sportscaster
- 1960 – Conway Savage, Australian singer-songwriter and keyboard player (died 2018)
- 1960 – Emily Thornberry, English lawyer and politician
- 1961 – Ed Orgeron, American football coach
- 1962 – Neil Brooks, Australian swimmer
- 1962 – Karl Mueller, American bass player (died 2005)
- 1963 – Donnie Yen, Chinese-Hong Kong actor, director, producer, and martial artist
- 1963 – Karrin Allyson, American jazz singer
- 1964 – Rex Brown, American bass player and songwriter
- 1965 – José Luis Chilavert, Paraguayan footballer
- 1966 – Steve Tilson, English footballer and manager
- 1967 – Rahul Bose, Indian journalist, actor, director, and screenwriter
- 1967 – Juliana Hatfield, American singer-songwriter and musician
- 1967 – Hans Mathisen, Norwegian guitarist and composer
- 1967 – Neil Smith, English cricketer
- 1967 – Craig Wolanin, American ice hockey player
- 1968 – Maria Grazia Cucinotta, Italian actress and producer
- 1968 – Tom Goodwin, American baseball player and coach
- 1968 – Sabina Jeschke, Swedish-German engineer and academic
- 1968 – Julian McMahon, Australian actor and producer (died 2025)
- 1968 – Ricardo Rosset, Brazilian race car driver
- 1969 – Triple H, American wrestler and actor
- 1969 – Jonty Rhodes, South African cricketer and coach
- 1969 – Jason Woolley, Canadian ice hockey player
- 1970 – Nikolaj Coster-Waldau, Danish actor and producer
- 1970 – David Davies, English-Welsh politician
- 1971 – Matthew Johns, Australian rugby league player, sportscaster and television host
- 1971 – Anna Menconi, Italian Paralympic archer
- 1972 – Clint Robinson, Australian kayaker
- 1972 – Maya Rudolph, American actress and comedian
- 1972 – Sheikh Muszaphar Shukor, Malaysian surgeon and astronaut
- 1973 – Cassandra Clare, American journalist and author
- 1973 – Erik Nys, Belgian long jumper
- 1973 – Gorden Tallis, Australian rugby league player and coach
- 1973 – Abe Cunningham, American drummer
- 1974 – Eason Chan, Hong Kong singer, actor, and producer
- 1974 – Pete Yorn, American singer-songwriter and guitarist
- 1975 – Serkan Çeliköz, Turkish keyboard player and songwriter
- 1975 – Shea Hillenbrand, American baseball player
- 1975 – Fred Mascherino, American singer-songwriter and guitarist
- 1975 – Alessandro Pistone, Italian footballer
- 1975 – Alex Rodriguez, American baseball player
- 1976 – Singrid Campion, French businesswoman and singer
- 1976 – Demis Hassabis, English computer scientist and academic
- 1976 – Scott Mason, Australian cricketer (died 2005)
- 1976 – Mwadi Mabika, Congolese-American basketball player
- 1977 – Foo Swee Chin, Singaporean illustrator
- 1977 – Björn Dreyer, German footballer
- 1977 – Jonathan Rhys Meyers, Irish actor
- 1978 – Diarmuid O'Sullivan, Irish hurler and manager
- 1979 – Marielle Franco, Brazilian politician, feminist, and human rights activist (died 2018)
- 1979 – Jorge Arce, Mexican boxer
- 1979 – Sidney Govou, French footballer
- 1979 – Shannon Moore, American wrestler and singer
- 1980 – Allan Davis, Australian cyclist
- 1980 – Wesley Gonzales, Filipino basketball player
- 1980 – Dolph Ziggler, American wrestler and comedian
- 1981 – Susan King Borchardt, American basketball player
- 1981 – Collins Obuya, Kenyan cricketer
- 1981 – Dash Snow, American painter and photographer (died 2009)
- 1981 – Christopher Weselek, German rugby player
- 1982 – Neil Harbisson, English-Catalan painter, composer, and activist
- 1983 – Lorik Cana, Albanian footballer
- 1983 – Martijn Maaskant, Dutch cyclist
- 1983 – Goran Pandev, Macedonian footballer
- 1983 – Soccor Velho, Indian footballer (died 2013)
- 1983 – Heidi Gardner, American actress and comedian
- 1984 – Antoine Bethea, American football player
- 1984 – Cecilie Myrseth, Norwegian politician
- 1984 – Tsuyoshi Nishioka, Japanese baseball player
- 1984 – Max Scherzer, American baseball player
- 1984 – Taylor Schilling, American actress
- 1984 – Kenny Wormald, American actor, dancer, and choreographer
- 1985 – Husain Abdullah, American football player
- 1985 – Matteo Pratichetti, Italian rugby player
- 1985 – Ajmal Shahzad, English cricketer
- 1986 – DeMarre Carroll, American basketball player
- 1986 – Ryan Flaherty, American baseball player
- 1986 – Ryan Griffen, Australian footballer
- 1987 – Jacoby Ford, American football player
- 1987 – Marek Hamšík, Slovak footballer
- 1987 – Jordan Hill, American basketball player
- 1987 – Sarah Parsons, American ice hockey player
- 1988 – Adam Biddle, Australian footballer
- 1988 – Yoervis Medina, Venezuelan baseball player
- 1988 – Ryan Tannehill, American football player
- 1989 – Maya Ali, Pakistani actress
- 1990 – Paolo Hurtado, Peruvian footballer
- 1990 – Cheyenne Kimball, American singer-songwriter and guitarist
- 1990 – Stephen Li-Chung Kuo, Taiwanese-American figure skater
- 1990 – Kriti Sanon, Indian actress
- 1991 – Wandy Peralta, Dominican baseball player
- 1992 – Tory Lanez, Canadian singer and rapper
- 1993 – Max Power, English footballer
- 1993 – Jordan Spieth, American golfer
- 1994 – Winnie Harlow, Canadian model
- 1995 – Mercedes Russell, American basketball player
- 1995 – Drew Rasmussen, American baseball player
- 2001 – Miguel Gutiérrez, Spanish footballer
- 2003 – Elvina Kalieva, American tennis player

== Deaths ==
=== Pre-1600 ===
- 903 – Abdallah II of Ifriqiya, Aghlabid emir
- 959 – Chai Rong, emperor of Later Zhou
- 1144 – Salomea of Berg, High Duchess consort of Poland
- 1061 – Nicholas II, pope of the Catholic Church
- 1101 – Conrad II, king of Italy (born 1074)
- 1101 – Hugh d'Avranches, Earl of Chester (born c. 1047)
- 1158 – Geoffrey VI, Count of Anjou (born 1134)
- 1276 – James I of Aragon (born 1208)
- 1365 – Rudolf IV, Duke of Austria (born 1339)
- 1382 – Joanna I of Naples (born 1326)
- 1469 – William Herbert, 1st Earl of Pembroke (born 1423)

=== 1601–1900 ===
- 1656 – Salomo Glassius, German theologian and critic (born 1593)
- 1675 – Henri de la Tour d'Auvergne, Vicomte de Turenne, French general (born 1611)
- 1689 – John Graham, 1st Viscount Dundee, Scottish general (born c. 1648)
- 1759 – Pierre Louis Maupertuis, French mathematician and philosopher (born 1698)
- 1770 – Robert Dinwiddie, Scottish merchant and politician, Colonial Governor of Virginia (born 1693)
- 1841 – Mikhail Lermontov, Russian poet and painter (born 1814)
- 1844 – John Dalton, English physicist, meteorologist, and chemist (born 1776)
- 1863 – William Lowndes Yancey, American journalist and politician (born 1813)
- 1865 – Jean-Joseph Dassy, French painter and lithographer (born 1791)
- 1875 – Aleksander Kunileid, Estonian composer and educator (born 1845)
- 1876 – Albertus van Raalte, Dutch-born American minister and author (born 1811)
- 1883 – Montgomery Blair, American lieutenant and politician, 20th United States Postmaster General (born 1813)

=== 1901–present ===
- 1916 – Charles Fryatt, English captain (born 1872)
- 1916 – William Jonas, English footballer (born 1890)
- 1917 – Emil Theodor Kocher, Swiss physician and academic, Nobel Prize laureate (born 1841)
- 1921 – Myrddin Fardd, Welsh writer and antiquarian scholar (born 1836)
- 1924 – Ferruccio Busoni, Italian pianist, composer, and conductor (born 1866)
- 1931 – Auguste Forel, Swiss neuroanatomist and psychiatrist (born 1848)
- 1938 – Tom Crean, Irish seaman and explorer (born 1877)
- 1941 – Alfred Henry O'Keeffe, New Zealand painter and educator (born 1858)
- 1942 – Karl Pärsimägi, Estonian painter (born 1902)
- 1942 – Hermann Brauneck, German physician and SA general (born 1894)
- 1946 – Gertrude Stein, American novelist, poet, and playwright (born 1874)
- 1948 – Woolf Barnato, English race car driver and businessman (born 1898)
- 1948 – Joe Tinker, American baseball player and manager (born 1880)
- 1951 – Paul Kogerman, Estonian chemist and politician, 22nd Estonian Minister of Education (born 1891)
- 1958 – Claire Lee Chennault, American general and pilot (born 1893)
- 1960 – Julie Vinter Hansen, Danish-Swiss astronomer and academic (born 1890)
- 1962 – Richard Aldington, English poet and author (born 1892)
- 1962 – James H. Kindelberger, American pilot and businessman (born 1895)
- 1963 – Hooks Dauss, American baseball player (born 1889)
- 1963 – Garrett Morgan, American inventor (born 1877)
- 1964 – Winifred Lenihan, American actress, writer, and director (born 1898)
- 1965 – Daniel-Rops, French historian and author (born 1901)
- 1967 – Tone Peruško, Croatian educator and social worker (born 1905)
- 1968 – Babe Adams, American baseball player and manager (born 1882)
- 1970 – António de Oliveira Salazar, Portuguese economist and politician, 100th Prime Minister of Portugal (born 1889)
- 1971 – Charlie Tully, Irish footballer and manager (born 1924)
- 1975 – Alfred Duraiappah, Sri Lankan Tamil lawyer and politician (born 1926)
- 1975 – Kristian Welhaven, Norwegian police officer (born 1883)
- 1978 – Bob Heffron, New Zealand-Australian miner and politician, 30th Premier of New South Wales (born 1890)
- 1978 – Willem van Otterloo, Dutch cellist, composer, and conductor (born 1907)
- 1980 – Mohammad Reza Pahlavi, Iranian Shah (born 1919)
- 1980 – Rushdy Abaza, Egyptian actor (born 1926)
- 1981 – William Wyler, American director, producer, and screenwriter (born 1902)
- 1981 – Elizabeth Rona, Hungarian American nuclear chemist (born 1890)
- 1984 – James Mason, English actor (born 1909)
- 1985 – Smoky Joe Wood, American baseball player and coach (born 1889)
- 1987 – Travis Jackson, American baseball player, coach, and manager (born 1903)
- 1988 – Frank Zamboni, American inventor and businessman, founded the Zamboni Company (born 1901)
- 1990 – Bobby Day, American singer-songwriter, pianist, and producer (born 1928)
- 1990 – René Toribio, Guadeloupean politician (born 1912)
- 1991 – John Friedrich, German-Australian engineer and conman (born 1950)
- 1992 – Max Dupain, Australian photographer and educator (born 1911)
- 1992 – Tzeni Karezi, Greek actress and screenwriter
- 1993 – Reggie Lewis, American basketball player (born 1965)
- 1994 – Kevin Carter, South African photographer and journalist (born 1960)
- 1995 – Melih Esenbel, Turkish politician and diplomat, 20th Turkish Minister of Foreign Affairs (born 1915)
- 1995 – Rick Ferrell, American baseball player and coach (born 1905)
- 1995 – Miklós Rózsa, Hungarian-American composer and conductor (born 1907)
- 1998 – Binnie Barnes, English-American actress (born 1903)
- 1999 – Aleksandr Danilovich Aleksandrov, Russian mathematician, physicist, and mountaineer (born 1912)
- 1999 – Harry Edison, American trumpet player (born 1915)
- 2000 – Gordon Solie, American sportscaster (born 1929)
- 2001 – Rhonda Sing, Canadian wrestler (born 1961)
- 2001 – Leon Wilkeson, American bass player and songwriter (born 1952)
- 2003 – Vance Hartke, American lieutenant, lawyer, and politician (born 1919)
- 2003 – Bob Hope, English-American actor, comedian, television personality, and businessman (born 1903)
- 2005 – Al Held, American painter and academic (born 1928)
- 2005 – Marten Toonder, Dutch author and illustrator (born 1912)
- 2006 – Maryann Mahaffey, American academic and politician (born 1925)
- 2007 – James Oyebola, Nigerian-English boxer (born 1961)
- 2008 – Youssef Chahine, Egyptian director, producer, and screenwriter (born 1926)
- 2008 – Horst Stein, German-born Swiss conductor (born 1928)
- 2008 – Isaac Saba Raffoul, Mexican businessman (born 1923)
- 2010 – Maury Chaykin, American-Canadian actor (born 1949)
- 2010 – Jack Tatum, American football player (born 1948)
- 2012 – Norman Alden, American actor (born 1924)
- 2012 – R. G. Armstrong, American actor and playwright (born 1917)
- 2012 – Darryl Cotton, Australian singer-songwriter, guitarist, and actor (born 1949)
- 2012 – Geoffrey Hughes, English actor (born 1944)
- 2012 – Tony Martin, American actor and singer (born 1913)
- 2012 – Jack Taylor, English footballer and referee (born 1930)
- 2013 – Fernando Alonso, Cuban dancer, co-founded the Cuban National Ballet (born 1914)
- 2013 – Lindy Boggs, American politician and diplomat, 5th United States Ambassador to the Holy See (born 1916)
- 2013 – Bud Day, American colonel and pilot, Medal of Honor recipient (born 1925)
- 2013 – Kidd Kraddick, American radio host (born 1959)
- 2013 – Ilya Segalovich, Russian businessman, co-founded Yandex (born 1964)
- 2014 – Richard Bolt, New Zealand air marshal and pilot (born 1923)
- 2014 – George Freese, American baseball player and coach (born 1926)
- 2014 – Wallace Jones, American basketball player and coach (born 1926)
- 2014 – Francesco Marchisano, Italian cardinal (born 1929)
- 2014 – Paul Schell, American lawyer and politician, 50th Mayor of Seattle (born 1937)
- 2015 – Rickey Grundy, American singer-songwriter (born 1959)
- 2015 – A. P. J. Abdul Kalam, Indian engineer, academic, and politician, 11th President of India (born 1931)
- 2015 – Samuel Pisar, Polish-born American lawyer and author (born 1929)
- 2015 – Anthony Shaw, English general (born 1930)
- 2016 – Einojuhani Rautavaara, Finnish composer (born 1928)
- 2016 – James Alan McPherson, American short story writer and essayist (born 1943)
- 2016 – Jerry Doyle, American actor and talk show host (born 1956)
- 2016 – Piet de Jong, Dutch politician and naval officer, Minister of Defence, Prime Minister of the Netherlands (born 1915)
- 2017 – Sam Shepard, American playwright, actor, author, screenwriter, and director (born 1943)
- 2018 – Marco Aurelio Denegri, Peruvian literature critic, television host and sexologist
- 2022 – Tony Dow, American actor, film producer, director, and sculptor (born 1945)
- 2024 – Edna O'Brien, Irish novelist, playwright, poet and short story writer (born 1930)
- 2024 – Pavel Kushnir, Russian pianist, writer, activist and political prisoner (born 1984)

== Holidays and observances ==
- Christian feast day:
  - Anthusa of Mantinea
  - Aurelius and Natalia and companions of the Martyrs of Córdoba.
  - Blessed Maria Maddalena Martinengo
  - Maurus, Pantalemon, and Sergius
  - Pantaleon
  - Seven Sleepers of Ephesus (Roman Martyrology)
    - National Sleepy Head Day (Finland)
  - July 27 (Eastern Orthodox liturgics)
- Day of Victory in the Great Fatherland Liberation War (North Korea)
- Iglesia ni Cristo Day (the Philippines)
- José Celso Barbosa Day (Puerto Rico)
- Medical Workers Day (Ukraine)
- Martyrs and Wounded Soldiers Day (Vietnam)
