= Anthousa =

Anthousa or Anthoussa may refer to:

== Places in Greece ==
- Anthousa, Attica, a town in East Attica
- Anthousa, Kozani, a town in Tsotyli, Kozani
- Anthousa, Messenia, a settlement in Messenia
- Anthousa, Preveza, a village in Preveza, Epirus
- Anthousa, Trikala, a village in Aspropotamos, Trikala
- Anthousa Castle, a castle in Preveza

== Names ==
- Anthousa Roujoux, Greek daughter of Christos Palaskas (1788–1822)
- Anthousa, another name for the deity of fortune Tyche of Constantinople
- Anthousa, the monastic name of the wife of Nicholas Maliasenos in the 13th century
- Saint Anthousa the Younger (757–809), nun and last child of Eudokia, wife of Constantine V

== See also ==
- Anthousa, Xanthousa, Chrisomalousa, a Greek folktale
