= Melissenos family =

Noble Byzantine family

Coat of arms of the Russian branch of the family

The Melissenos family (Greek: Μελισσηνός), latinized Melissenus, feminine form Melissene (Μελισσηνή), latinized Melissena, was the name of a Byzantine noble family that flourished from the late 8th century on until the end of the Byzantine Empire and beyond.

== History ==
The Melissenoi are one of the oldest known aristocratic Greek families of the middle Byzantine period. Genealogies from the 16th and 17th centuries trace the family to a patrikios Michael, relative of Michael I Rhangabe (reigned 811–813) and his son the magistros Leo, but the family stretches back another half-century to the general Michael Melissenos, a favourite of Emperor Constantine V (r. 741–775). This Michael married a sister of Constantine's wife, Eudokia, and their son, Theodore Kassiteras Melissenos, became Patriarch of Constantinople in 815–821.

In the 9th–11th centuries, they were mostly active in Asia Minor, serving as generals and governors of the local themes. In the late 11th century, the family seems to have had ties particularly with the area of Dorylaion in Phrygia.

The Melissenoi also appear to have maintained close ties to the other families comprising the military aristocracy (the dynatoi) of this period, which likewise mostly originated from Asia Minor. Thus, two of the Melissenoi, the doux of Antioch Leo and his brother Theognostos, supported the aristocratic revolt of Bardas Phokas the Younger in the early reign of Basil II (r. 976–1025). For the remainder of Basil's reign, the Melissenoi do not appear to have occupied high military posts, but they re-appear among the highest rungs of the aristocracy in the later 11th century, when a Theognostes Melissenos was katepano of Mesopotamia, while Maria Melissene was one of the few holders of the exalted title of zoste patrikia.

In the 1080s the general Nikephoros Melissenos, after launching a rebellion against Nikephoros III Botaneiates (r. 1078–1081), accommodated himself with Botaneiates' successor, Alexios I Komnenos (r. 1081–1118), whose sister Eudokia he had married, in exchange for the title of Caesar and estates near Thessalonica. Under the Komnenian emperors, the Melissenoi were chiefly civil officials, but despite their family ties to the reigning dynasty, the family ceased occupying high state offices after ca. 1118.

In the 13th century, a branch of the family are attested as landowners around Smyrna, while other branches of the family settled in the Morea and in Epirus, and a lady of the house even married Michael I Komnenos Doukas, the founder of the Despotate of Epirus. Later traditions also hold that an Andreas Melissenos moved to Crete as one of the twelve noble families of Crete, founding there a local branch of the family. From this line the later Melissenoi descended, including Patriarch Gregory III of Constantinople (1443–1450).

The 18th-century Russian general Pyotr Melissino, born in Cephalonia, claimed descent from the Cretan branch of the Melissenos family. His son, Aleksey, also became a general in the Imperial Russian Army, and served in the Patriotic War of 1812. He was killed at the Battle of Dresden in 1813. Cephalonian poet and lawer Antonios Melissenos was also member of this branch of Melissenos family.

Sophia Antoniadis, the first female professor of the Humanities in the Netherlands, was descended from the family.

The 16th-century historian and metropolitan of Monemvasia, Makarios Melissenos, was not an actual member of the family, but adopted the surname during his exile at the court of Naples.

== Sources ==
- Cheynet, Jean-Claude (1990). Pouvoir et Contestations à Byzance (963–1210) (in French). Paris: Publications de la Sorbonne. ISBN 978-2-85944-168-5.
- Jordanov, I. (1986). "Les sceaux de deux chefs militaires byzantins trouvés à Preslav: le magistros Léon Melissenos et le patrice Theodorakan". Byzantinoslavica (in French). 8: 183–187.
- Kazhdan, Alexander (1991). "Melissenos". In Kazhdan, Alexander (ed.). The Oxford Dictionary of Byzantium. Oxford and New York: Oxford University Press. p. 1335. ISBN 0-19-504652-8.
- Jeffreys, Elizabeth M.; Kazhdan, Alexander (1991). "Melissenos, Makarios". In Kazhdan, Alexander (ed.). The Oxford Dictionary of Byzantium. Oxford and New York: Oxford University Press. pp. 1335–1336. ISBN 0-19-504652-8.
- Krsmanović, Bojana (2003). "Melissenos Family". Encyclopaedia of the Hellenic World, Asia Minor. Foundation of the Hellenic World.
- Melisseidis, Ioannis A., ed. (2004). Εάλω η Πόλις. Το χρονικό της άλωσης της Κωνσταντινούπολης. Συνοπτική ιστορία των γεγονότων στην Κωνσταντινούπολη κατά την περίοδο 1440 - 1453 (in Greek). Vergina. ISBN 960-7171-91-8.
- Rochow, Ilse (1994). Kaiser Konstantin V. (741–775). Materialien zu seinem Leben und Nachleben (in German). Frankfurt am Main: Peter Lang. ISBN 3-631-47138-6.
