= Björn Dreyer =

Björn Dreyer may refer to:

- Björn Dreyer (footballer born 1977), German footballer
- Björn Dreyer (footballer born 1989), German footballer
