= Medical Worker Day =

Holiday

Medical Worker Day (Russian: День медицинского работника, romanized: Den' Meditsinskava Rabotnika) is a professional holiday of medical staff which used to be celebrated in the Soviet Union and still continues to be celebrated in many post-Soviet countries. In most cases, the date of celebration is the third Sunday of June.

== History ==
Medical Worker Day has been celebrated since 1988, when Supreme Soviet of the Soviet Union edited its decree "About commemorative dates and observances" dated 1980.

== Country coverage ==
Currently, Medical Worker Day is officially celebrated in Russia, Belarus, Kazakhstan, Latvia, Moldova, Armenia, and Azerbaijan. It is celebrated every year on the third Sunday of June in all the above countries besides Azerbaijan (on June 17 annually) and Ukraine (annually until 2022).

In Ukraine, Medical Worker Day was officially celebrated from 1994 to 2022. Since 2023, in accordance with Decree of the President of Ukraine dated June 13, 2023 No. 327/2023, the annual celebration on July 27 of another holiday, Medical Workers Day, has been established.

== See also ==
- International Nurses Day
- National Doctors' Day
