= Francesco Gaeta =

Francesco Gaeta may refer to:

- Francesco Gaeta (poet) (1879–1927), Italian poet
- Francesco Gaeta (bishop) (1605–1669), Italian Roman Catholic bishop
