= Patriarch Nicephorus of Constantinople =

Patriarch Nicephorus of Constantinople may refer to:

- Nikephoros I of Constantinople, Ecumenical Patriarch in 806–815
- Nicephorus II of Constantinople, Ecumenical Patriarch in 1260–1261
