= Antony I of Constantinople =

Ecumenical Patriarch of Constantinople from 821 to 837

- Ecumenical Patriarch of Constantinople
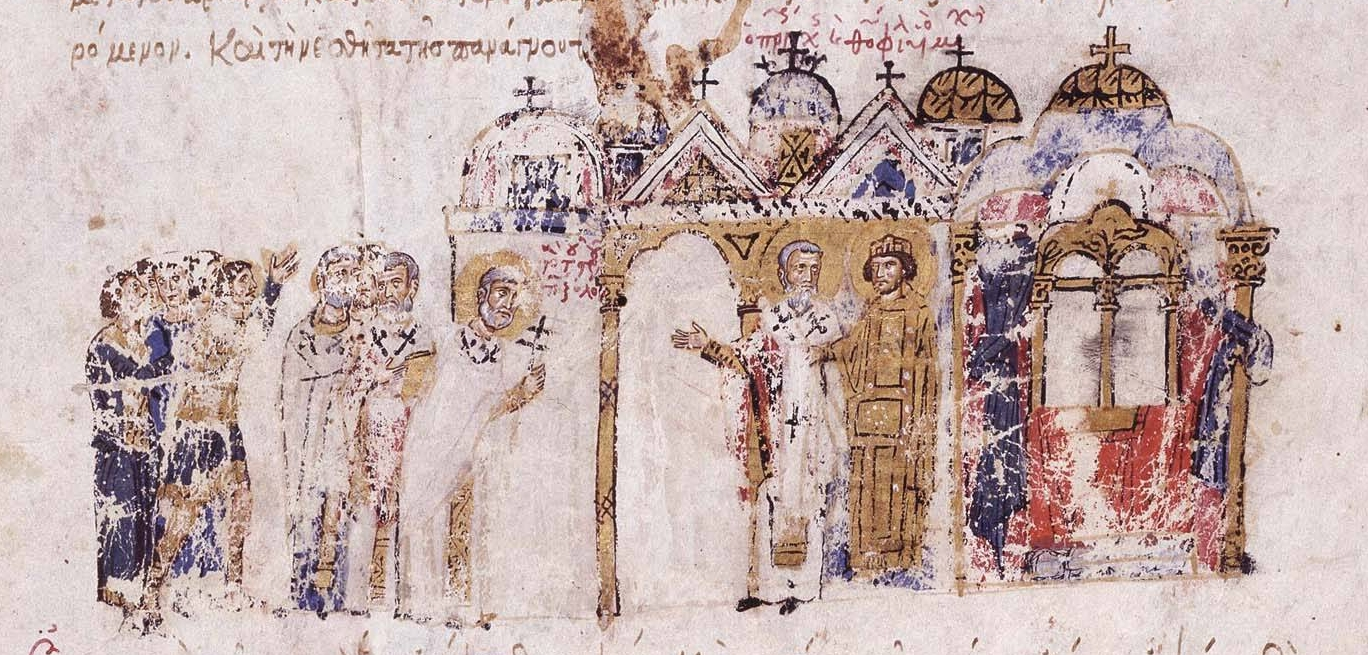
- Emperor Theophilos and patriarch Antony I during Thomas the Slav's siege, Madrid Skylitzes, 11th century.
- Installed: January 821
- Term ended: 21 January 837
- Predecessor: Theodotus I of Constantinople
- Successor: John VII of Constantinople

Personal details
- Born: Antonios Kas(s)ymatas
- Died: 21 January 837
- Denomination: Iconoclast, previously Chalcedonian Christianity

Antony I of Constantinople (Greek: Ἀντώνιος Κασ(σ)υματᾶς, romanized: Antōnios Kas(s)ymatas; died 21 January 837) Ecumenical Patriarch of Constantinople from January 821 to 21 January 837.

== Life ==
Antony was of undistinguished background, but received a good education, becoming a lawyer in Constantinople in c. 800. He later became a monk and advanced to the position of abbot. By 814, he had become the bishop of Syllaion in Anatolia. Although Antony was an Iconodule, he became an Iconoclast in 815, when Emperor Leo V the Armenian reinstituted Iconoclasm. The reason for Antony's change of heart is said to have included his hope for attaining the patriarchate. The emperor appointed him a member of the committee headed by the future Patriarch John VII of Constantinople to find patristic support for Iconoclasm. In 821, the new Emperor Michael II appointed Antony patriarch, disappointing the monastery of Stoudios, who were hoping that icons would be restored. When the patriarch of Antioch crowned Thomas the Slav rival emperor, Antony I had him excommunicated in 822. The iconodule historians record that Antony I was stricken with a wasting disease as divine punishment for his participation in Iconoclast councils. The patriarch died early in 837 and was later anathematised in the Orthodox synodika.

== Notes and references ==
=== Attribution ===
- The Oxford Dictionary of Byzantium, Oxford University Press, 1991.

Titles of Chalcedonian Christianity
Preceded by Theodotus I	Ecumenical Patriarchs of Constantinople; 821 - 837	Succeeded by John VII
