= Photios I of Constantinople =

Ecumenical Patriarch of Constantinople from 858 to 867 and from 877 to 886

Saint Photios I of Constantinople
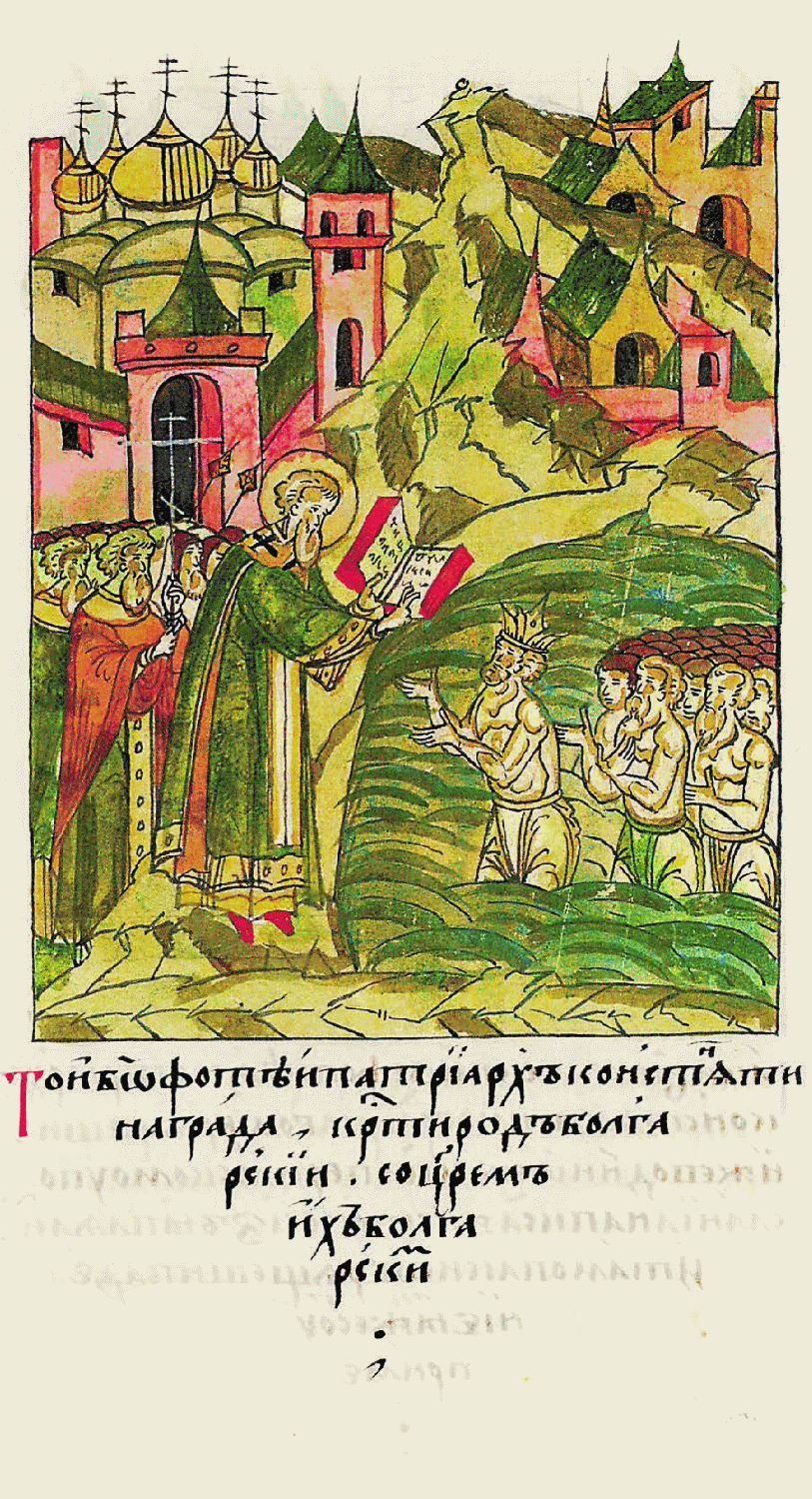
- Photios I baptising the Bulgarians, miniature from the Illustrated Chronicle of Ivan the Terrible (16th century)

The Great, Confessor of the Faith, Equal to the Apostles, Pillar of Orthodoxy
- Born: c. 815; Constantinople, Byzantine Empire
- Died: 6 February 893 (aged c. 78)
- Venerated in: Eastern Orthodox Church; Byzantine Catholic Churches
- Canonized: 10th century
- Feast: 6 February

Photios I of Constantinople
- Ecumenical Patriarch of Constantinople
- Installed: 25 December 858; 26 October 877
- Term ended: 23 September 867; 30 September 886
- Predecessor: Ignatius of Constantinople; Ignatius of Constantinople
- Successor: Ignatius of Constantinople; Stephen I of Constantinople

Personal details
- Born: c. 815 Constantinople
- Died: 6 February 893 Bordi, Armenia
- Denomination: Chalcedonian Christianity

Photios I of Constantinople (/ˈfoʊʃəs/; also spelled Photius; Greek: Φώτιος, romanized: Phōtios; c. 815 – 6 February 893) (Note: The exact dates of Photios's birth and death are not known. Most sources list circa 810 and others circa 820 as his year of birth. He died some time between 890 and 895 (probably 891 or 893).) was the Ecumenical Patriarch of Constantinople from 858 to 867 and from 877 to 886. He is recognized in the Eastern Orthodox Church as 'Saint Photius the Great'.

Photios I is widely regarded as the most powerful and influential church leader of Constantinople subsequent to John Chrysostom's archbishopric around the turn of the fifth century. He is also viewed as the most important intellectual of his time—"the leading light of the ninth-century renaissance". He was a central figure in both the conversion of the Slavs to Christianity and the Photian schism, and is considered "[t]he great systematic compiler of the Eastern Church, who occupies a similar position to that of Gratian in the West," and whose "collection in two parts... formed and still forms the classic source of ancient Church Law for the Greek Church".

Photios was a well-educated man from a noble Constantinopolitan family. His mother was the sister of the previous patriarch of Constantinople John VII of Constantinople, and his great-granduncle was another previous patriarch of Constantinople, Saint Tarasius. He intended to be a monk but chose to be a scholar and statesman instead. In 858, Emperor Michael III (r. 842–867) decided to confine Patriarch Ignatius in order to force him into resignation, and Photius, still a layman, was appointed to replace him. Amid power struggles between the pope and the Byzantine emperor, Ignatius was reinstated. Photios I resumed the position when Ignatius died (877), by order of the Byzantine emperor. The new Pope John VIII, approved Photios's reinstatement. Catholics regard as legitimate a Fourth Council of Constantinople (Catholic Church) anathematising Photios I, while Eastern Orthodox regard as legitimate a subsequent Fourth Council of Constantinople (Eastern Orthodox), reversing the former. The contested councils mark the end of unity represented by the first seven Ecumenical Councils.

Photios also worked actively toward reconciliation with the Oriental Orthodox Churches.

== Secular life ==
Most of the sources about Photios's life were written by persons hostile to him especially his bitter enemy, Niketas David Paphlagon. Modern scholars are thus cautious when assessing their accuracy. (Note: The case of pseudo-Simeon's Chronicle is characteristic: the author argues that Photios was educated after an agreement he concluded with a Jewish magician who offered him knowledge and secular recognition, in case he renounced his faith.)

Little is known of Photios's origin and early years apart from the fact that he was born into a notable family and his uncle Saint Tarasius had been the patriarch of Constantinople from 784–806 under both Empress Irene of Athens (r. 797–802) and Emperor Nikephoros I (r. 802–811). During the second Iconoclasm, which began in 814, his family suffered persecution since his father, Sergios, was a prominent iconophile. Sergios's family returned to favor only after the restoration of the icons in 842. Certain scholars claim that Photius was, at least in part, of Armenian descent, (Note: David Marshall Lang argues that "Photius [...] was only one of many Byzantine scholars of Armenian descent". Peter Charanis notes that "John the Grammarian, Photius, Caesar Bardas and Leo the Philosopher seem to have been the prime movers. All four were, at least in part, of Armenian descent [...] as for Photius, the fact is that his mother Irene was the sister of Arshavir, the Arshavir who had married Calomaria the sister of Bardas and the empress Theodora." Nicholas Adontz stresses that "Arshavir, Photius' uncle, must not be confused with Arshavir, the brother of John the Grammarian".) but this has been challenged. (Note: Toby Bromige notes that "Shirinian identifies many influential Byzantines in the mid-ninth century, such as Photios [...] as Armenian in origin, but these claims have been challenged". There is a tendency amongst certain Byzantinists to propose an "Armenian" ancestry for certain Byzantine individuals and/or families with an obscure heritage as a "convenient solution", even if the evidence is flimsy, non-existent or completely fictional.) Others refer to him as a "Greek Byzantine". Byzantine writers also report that Emperor Michael III (r. 842–867) once angrily called Photios "Khazar-faced", but whether this was a generic insult or a reference to his ethnicity is unclear.

Although Photios had an excellent education, we have no information about how he received this education. The famous library he possessed attests to his enormous erudition (theology, history, grammar, philosophy, law, the natural sciences, and medicine). Most scholars believe that he never taught at Magnaura or at any other university; Vasileios N. Tatakes asserts that, even while he was patriarch, Photios taught "young students passionately eager for knowledge" at his home, which "was a center of learning". He was a friend of the renowned Byzantine scholar and teacher Leo the Mathematician. (Note: N. G. Wilson regards Leo the Mathematician as Photios's teacher, but Paul Lemerle notes that Leo was not one of the persons with whom Photios had a correspondence.)

Photios I says that, when he was young, he had an inclination for the monastic life, but instead he started a secular career. The way to public life was probably opened for him by (according to one account) the marriage of his brother Sergios to Irene, a sister of Empress Theodora, who upon the death of her husband Emperor Theophilos (r. 829–842) in 842, had assumed the regency of the Byzantine Empire. Photius became a captain of the guard (protospatharios) and subsequently chief imperial secretary (Protasekretis). At an uncertain date, Photios participated in an embassy to the Abbasids of Baghdad.

Photios achieved a dazzling reputation as a scholar. In a feud with Patriarch Ignatius, Photios invented a fanciful theory that people have two souls, for the sole purpose of tricking Ignatius into embarrassing himself by being seen to take it seriously, whereupon Photios withdrew his proposal and admitted he had not been serious. The historian John Julius Norwich described this as "perhaps the only really satisfactory practical joke in the whole history of theology".

== Patriarch of Constantinople ==
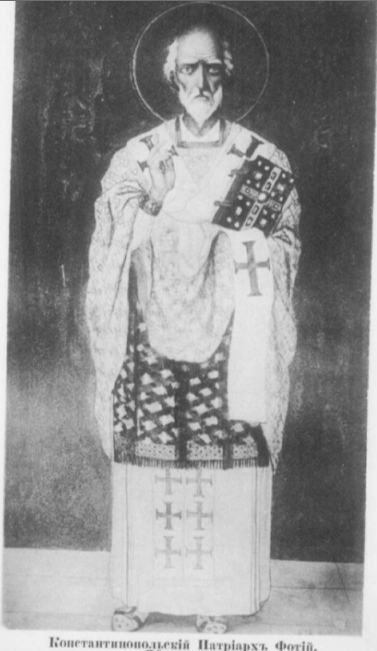
A fresco of Saint Photius as Patriarch of Constantinople

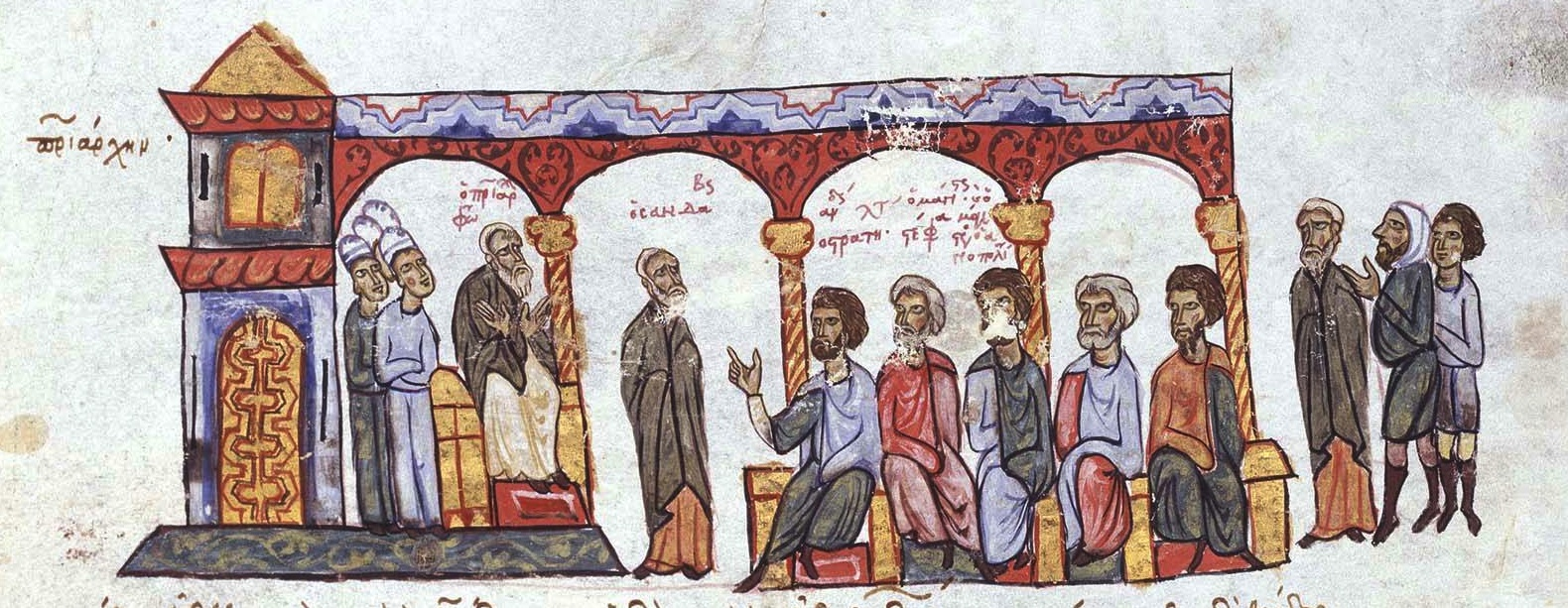
The trial of Photius, miniature from the 12th century Madrid Skylitzes

Photios's ecclesiastical career took off spectacularly after Caesar Bardas and his nephew, the youthful Emperor Michael III, put an end to the administration of the regent Theodora and the Logothetes tou dromou Theoktistos in 856. In 858, Bardas found himself opposed by the then Patriarch Ignatius of Constantinople, who refused to admit him into Hagia Sophia, since it was believed that he was having an affair with his widowed daughter-in-law. In response, Bardas and Michael engineered Ignatius's confinement and removal on the charge of treason, thus leaving the patriarchal throne empty. The throne was soon filled with a kinsman of Bardas, Photios himself, who was tonsured a monk on 20 December 858, and on the four following days was successively ordained lector, sub-deacon, deacon and priest, and then on Christmas Day, the patronal feast of Constantinople's cathedral, Hagia Sophia, Photios I was consecrated a bishop and installed as patriarch.

The confinement and removal of Ignatius and the speedy promotion of Photius at first caused only internal controversy within the Church of Constantinople, and in 859 a local council was held, examining the issue and confirming the removal of Ignatius and election of Photios. In the same time, partisans of Ignatius decided to appeal to the Holy Roman and Catholic Church, thus initiating ecclesiastical controversy on an ecumenical scale as the Pope and the rest of the western bishops took up the cause of Ignatius. The latter's confinement and removal without a formal ecclesiastical trial meant that Photios's election was uncanonical, and eventually Pope Nicholas I sought to involve himself in determining the legitimacy of the succession. His legates were dispatched to Constantinople with instructions to investigate, but finding Photios well ensconced, they acquiesced in the confirmation of his election at a synod in 861. On their return to Rome, they discovered that this was not at all what Nicholas had intended, and in 863 at a synod in Rome, the Supreme Pontiff deposed Photios I, and reappointed Ignatius as the rightful patriarch, triggering a schism. Four years later, Photios I was to respond on his own part by calling a Council and attempting to excommunicate the Holy Father on grounds of heresy—over the question of the double procession of the Holy Spirit. The situation was additionally complicated by the question of papal authority over the entire Church and by disputed jurisdiction over newly converted Bulgaria.

This state of affairs changed with the murder of Photios's patron Bardas in 866 and of Emperor Michael III in 867, by his colleague Basil I, who now usurped the throne. Photios I was deposed as patriarch, not so much because he was a protégé of Bardas and Michael, but because Basil I was seeking an alliance with the Pope and the Western emperor. Photios I was removed from his office and banished about the end of September 867, and Ignatius was reinstated on 23 November. Photios I was condemned by the Council of 869–870, thus putting an end to the schism. During his second patriarchate, however, Ignatius followed a policy not very different from that of Photios I.

Not long after his condemnation, Photios I had reingratiated himself with Basil I and became tutor to the Byzantine emperor's children. From surviving letters of Photios I written during his exile at the Skepi monastery, it appears that the ex-patriarch brought pressure to bear on the Byzantine emperor to restore him. Ignatius's biographer argues that Photios forged a document relating to the genealogy and rule of Basil I's family, and had it placed in the imperial library where a friend of his was a librarian. According to this document, the Byzantine emperor's ancestors were not mere peasants as everyone believed but descendants of the Arsacid dynasty of Armenia. True or not, this story does reveal Basil I's dependence on Photios I for literary and ideological matters. Following Photios I's recall, Ignatius and the ex-patriarch met and publicly expressed their reconciliation. When Ignatius died on 23 October 877, it was a matter of course that his old opponent replaced him on the patriarchal throne three days later. Shaun Tougher asserts that from this point on Basil I no longer simply depended on Photios, but in fact he was dominated by him.

Photios I now obtained the formal recognition of the Christian world in a council convened at Constantinople in November 879. The legates of Pope John VIII attended, prepared to acknowledge Photios I as legitimate patriarch, a concession for which the pope was much censured by Latin opinion. The patriarch stood firm on the main points contested between the Eastern and Western Churches: the demand of an apology to the Pope, the ecclesiastical jurisdiction over Bulgaria, and the addition of the Filioque to the Nicene Creed by the Western church. Eventually, Photios refused to apologize or accept the Filioque, and the papal legates made do with his return of Bulgaria to Rome. This concession, however, was purely nominal, as Bulgaria's return to the Byzantine rite in 870 had already secured for it an autocephalous church. Without the consent of Boris I of Bulgaria (r. 852–889), the papacy was unable to enforce its claims. Pope Adrian III chose a policy of appeasement and sent between 884 and 885 bishop Theodosius of Oria to transmit notice of his election and a synodal letter to Photios about faith and the Filioque.

Photios I also promoted a policy of religious reconciliation with the Armenian kingdom to the east of the empire. He sought to bridge the confessional differences between the Greek Orthodox and Armenian churches on two separate occasions, once in 862 and again in 877, but his efforts ultimately proved unsuccessful.

During the altercations between Emperor Basil I and his heir Leo VI the Wise, Photios took the side of the Byzantine emperor. In 883, Basil I accused Leo VI of conspiracy and confined the prince to the palace; he would have even had Leo VI blinded had he not been dissuaded by Photios I and Stylianos Zaoutzes, the father of Zoe Zaoutzaina, Leo's mistress. In 886, Basil I discovered and punished a conspiracy by the domestic of the Hikanatoi John Kourkouas and many other officials. In this conspiracy, Leo VI was not implicated, but Photios I was possibly one of the conspirators against Basil I's authority.

Basil I died in 886 injured while hunting, according to the official story. Warren Treadgold believes that this time the evidence points to a plot on behalf of Leo VI, who became emperor, and deposed Photios I, although the latter had been his tutor. Photios I was replaced by the Byzantine emperor's brother Stephen I of Constantinople and sent into exile to a monastery in Armenia. It is confirmed from letters to and from Pope Stephen V that Leo VI extracted a resignation from Photios I. In 887, Photios I and his protégé, Theodore Santabarenos, were put on trial for treason before a tribunal headed by senior officials, headed by Andrew the Scythian. Although the sources sympathetic to Photios I give the impression that the trial ended without a conviction, the chronicle of Pseudo-Simeon clearly states that Photios was banished to the monastery of Gordon, where he later died. Latin sources confirm that while he did not die in a state of complete excommunication, having been reinstated by a council which was approved by Pope John VIII, his ecclesiastical career was viewed in utter disgrace by Catholic authorities and many of his theological opinions were condemned posthumously. Yet it appears that he did not remain reviled for the remainder of his life.

Photios I continued his career as a writer throughout his exile, and Leo VI probably rehabilitated his reputation within the next few years; in his Epitaphios on his brothers, a text probably written in 888, the Emperor presents Photios I favorably, portraying him as the legitimate archbishop, and the instrument of ultimate unity, an image that jars with his attitude to the patriarch in the previous year. Confirmation that Photios was rehabilitated comes upon his death—according to some chronicles, his body was permitted to be buried in Constantinople. In addition, according to the anti-Photian biographer of Ignatius, partisans of the ex-patriarch after his death endeavored to claim for him the "honor of sainthood". Furthermore, a leading member of Leo VI's court, Leo Choirosphaktes, wrote poems commemorating the memory of several prominent contemporary figures, such as Leo the Mathematician and the Patriarch Stephen I, and he also wrote one on Photius. Shaun Tougher notes, however, that "yet Photius I's passing does seem rather muted for a great figure of Byzantine history [...] Leo VI [...] certainly did not allow him back into the sphere of politics, and it is surely his absence from this arena that accounts for his quiet passing."

== Veneration ==
After his death, Photios began to be venerated as saint in environs of Constantinople. His name features in a manuscript of the Typicon of the Great Church of Constantinople dated to the middle of the tenth century, where he is referred to a saint with a day of commemoration of February 6. According to Francis Dvornik, Photios I must have been venerated as a saint in the second half of the tenth century at the very latest.

The contemporary Eastern Orthodox Church venerates Photios I as a saint, with his feast day being 6 February.

== Assessments ==
Photios I is one of the most famous figures not only of 9th-century Byzantium, but of the entire history of the Byzantine Empire. One of the most learned men of his age, and revered—even by some of his opponents and detractors—as the most prolific theologian of his time, he has earned his fame due to his part in ecclesiastical conflicts, and also for his intellect and literary works.

Analyzing his intellectual work, Tatakes regards Photios as "mind turned more to practice than to theory". He believes that thanks to Photios I, humanism was added to Orthodoxy as a basic element of the national consciousness of the medieval Byzantines, returning it to the place it had had in the early Byzantine period. Tatakes also argues that having understood this national consciousness, Photios I emerged as a defender of the Greek nation and its spiritual independence in his debates with the Western Church. Adrian Fortescue regards him as "one of the most wonderful men of all the Middle Ages", and stresses that "had [he] not given his name to the great schism, he would always be remembered as the greatest scholar of his time". Yet, Fortescue is equally adamant of his condemnation of Photios I's involvement in the Schism: "And yet the other side of his character is no less evident. His insatiable ambition, his determination to obtain and keep the patriarchal see, led him to the extreme of dishonesty. His claim was worthless. That Ignatius was the rightful patriarch as long as he lived, and Photius an intruder, cannot be denied by any one who does not conceive the Church as merely the slave of a civil government. And to keep this place Photios I descended to the lowest depth of deceit".

== Writings ==
=== Bibliotheca ===
The most important of the works of Photios I is his Bibliotheca or Myriobiblon, a collection of extracts and abridgements of 280 volumes of previous authors (usually cited as Codices), the originals of which are now to a great extent lost. The work is especially rich in extracts from historical writers.

To Photios I, we are indebted for almost all we possess of Ctesias, Memnon of Heraclea, Conon, the lost books of Diodorus Siculus, and the lost writings of Arrian. Theology and ecclesiastical history are also very fully represented, but poetry and ancient philosophy are almost entirely ignored. It seems that he did not think it necessary to deal with those authors with whom every well-educated man would naturally be familiar. The literary criticisms, generally distinguished by keen and independent judgment, and the excerpts vary considerably in length. The numerous biographical notes are probably taken from the work of Hesychius of Miletus.

Some older scholarship speculated that the Bibliotheca was compiled in Baghdad at the time of Photios's embassy to the Abbasid court since many of the mentioned works were rarely cited during the so-called Byzantine Dark Ages c. 630—c. 800, and it was known that the Abbasids were interested in works of Greek science and philosophy. However, specialists of this period of Byzantine history, such as Paul Lemerle, have shown that Photios I could not have compiled his Bibliotheca in Baghdad because he clearly states in both his introduction and his postscript that when he learned of his appointment to the embassy, he sent his brother a summary of books that he read previously, "since the time I learned how to understand and evaluate literature" i.e. since his youth. Moreover, the Abbasids were interested only in Greek science, philosophy and medicine; they did not have Greek history, rhetoric, or other literary works translated; nor did they have Christian patristic writers translated. Yet the majority of works in Bibliotheca are by Christian patristic authors, and most of the secular texts in Bibliotheca are histories, grammars or literary works, usually rhetoric, rather than science, medicine or philosophy. This further indicates that the majority of the works cannot have been read while Photios I was in the Abbasid empire.

=== Other works ===
The Lexicon (Λέξεων Συναγωγή), published later than the Bibliotheca, was probably in the main the work of some of his pupils. It was intended as a book of reference to facilitate the reading of old classical and sacred authors, whose language and vocabulary were out of date. For a long time, the only manuscripts of the Lexicon were the Codex Galeanus, which passed into the library of Trinity College, Cambridge and Berolinensis grace., 22 October, both of which were incomplete. But in 1959, Linos Politis of the University of Thessaloniki discovered a complete manuscript, codex Zavordensis 95, in the Zavorda Monastery (Greek: Ζάβορδα) in Grevena, Greece, where it still resides.

His most important theological work is the Amphilochia, a collection of some 300 questions and answers on difficult points in Scripture, addressed to Amphilochius, archbishop of Cyzicus. Other similar works are his treatise in four books against the Manichaeans and Paulicians, and his controversy with the Latins on the Procession of the Holy Spirit. Photius also addressed a long letter of theological advice to the newly converted Boris I of Bulgaria. Numerous other Epistles also survive.

Photios I is also the writer of two "mirrors of princes", addressed to Boris-Michael of Bulgaria (Epistula 1, ed. Terzaghi) and to Leo VI the Wise (Admonitory Chapters of Basil I).

Photios I's epitome of Philostorgius's Church History is the principal source for the work, which is now lost.

The first English translation, by the Holy Transfiguration Monastery, of the Mystagogy of the Holy Spirit by Photios was published in 1983. Another translation was published in 1987 with a preface by Archimandrite (now Archbishop) Chrysostomos of Etna.

== See also ==
- Byzantine philosophy
- Filioque clause
- University of Magnaura
- Bibliotheca (Photius)
- Bibliotheca (Pseudo-Apollodorus)

== Sources ==
=== Primary sources ===
Recent years have seen the first translations into English of a number of primary sources about Photios and his times:

- Featherstone, Jeffrey Michael and Signes-Codoñer, Juan (translators), Chronographiae quae Theophanis Continuati nomine fertur Libri I-IV, (Chronicle of Theophanes Continuatus, Books I-IV, comprising the reigns of Leo V the Armenian to Michael III), Berlin, Boston, De Gruyter, 2015.
- Kaldellis, A. (trans.), On the reigns of the emperors, (the history of Joseph Genesius), Canberra, Australian Association for Byzantine Studies; Byzantina Australiensia 11, 1998.
- Ševčenko, Ihor (trans.), Chronographiae quae Theophanis Continuati nomine fertur Liber quo Vita Basilii Imperatoris amplectitur, (Chronicle of Theophanes Continuatus comprising the Life of Basil I), Berlin, De Gruyter, 2011.
- Wahlgren, Staffan (translator, writer of introduction and commentary), The Chronicle of the Logothete, Liverpool University Press; Translated Texts for Byzantinists, vol. 7, 2019.
- Wortley, John (trans.), A synopsis of Byzantine history, 811–1057, (the history of John Scylitzes, active 1081), Cambridge University Press, 2010.

=== Secondary sources ===
- Adontz, Nicholas (1950). "Role of the Armenians in Byzantine Science". Armenian Review. 3 (3): 55–73.
- Chadwick, Henry (2003). East and West - The Making of a Rift in the Church: From Apostolic Times until the Council of Florence. Oxford: Oxford University Press. ISBN 978-0-19-926457-5.
- Bromige, Toby (2023). Armenians in the Byzantine Empire: Identity, Assimilation and Alienation from 867 to 1098. I.B. Tauris. ISBN 978-0-7556-4242-7.
- Bryer, Anthony (1980). The Empire of Trebizond and the Pontos. Variorum Reprints. ISBN 978-0-86078-062-5.
- Charanis, Peter (1963). The Armenians in the Byzantine Empire. Lisbon: Fundação Calouste Gulbenkian Armenian Library. OCLC 17186882.
- Cross, Frank Leslie; Livingstone, Elizabeth A. (2005). The Oxford Dictionary of the Christian Church. Oxford: Oxford University Press. ISBN 0-19-280290-9.
- Dorfmann-Lazarev, Igor (2004). Arméniens et Byzantins à l'époque de Photius - Deux débats théologiques après le triomphe de l'Orthodoxie. Vol. 609 (Subsidia Tomus 117). Louvain, Belgium: Edition Peters (Corpus Scriptorum Christianorum Orientalium). ISBN 90-429-1412-2.
- Dunlop, Douglas Morton (1954). The History of the Jewish Khazars. Princeton, New Jersey: Princeton University Press.
- Durant, Will (1972). The Age of Faith. New York: Simon & Schuster.
- Dvornik, Francis (1948). The Photian Schism - History and Legend. Cambridge: Cambridge University Press.
- Fortescue, Adrian (2001). The Orthodox Eastern Church. Piscataway, New Jersey: Gorgias Press. ISBN 0-9715986-1-4.
- Green, Timothy (2006). "Failure of a Mission? Photius and the Armenian Church". Le Muséon. 119 (1–2): 123–168. doi:10.2143/MUS.119.1.2011771.
- Gren, Erik (2002). Orientalia Suecana. Vol. 51–52. Stockholm, Sweden: Almqvist & Wiksell.
- Ives, Samuel A. (October 1951). "Photius of Constantinople, the First Book-Reviewer". The Library Quarterly. 21 (4). University of Chicago Press: 285–289. doi:10.1086/617818. ISSN 0024-2519.
- Jenkins, Romilly James Heald (1987). Byzantium - The Imperial Centuries, 610–1071 AD. Toronto: Medieval Academy of America (University of Toronto Press). ISBN 0-8020-6667-4.
- Jokisch, Benjamin (2007). Islamic Imperial Law - Harun-al-Rashid's Codification Project. Berlin: Walter de Gruyter. ISBN 978-3-11-019048-9.
- Kaldellis, Anthony (2019). Romanland - Ethnicity and Empire in Byzantium. Harvard University Press. ISBN 978-0-674-98651-0.
- Lang, David Marshall (1988). The Armenians - A People in Exile. London: Allen & Unwin. ISBN 9780044402893.
- Lemerle, Paul (1986). Byzantine Humanism. Canberra: Australian Association for Byzantine Studies.
- Louth, Andrew (2007). Greek East and Latin West - The Church, 681–1071 AD. Crestwood, NY: Saint Vladimir's Orthodox Theological Seminary. ISBN 978-0-88141-320-5.
- Mango, Cyril A. (1980). Byzantium - The Empire of New Rome. New York: Charles Scribner's Sons. ISBN 0-684-16768-9.
- Norwich, John Julius (1991). Byzantium - The Apogee. London: BCA.
- Paidas, Konstantinos D. S. (2005). Η θεματική των βυζαντινών κατόπτρων ηγεμόνος της πρώιμης και μέσης περιόδου 398-1085 [The theme of the Byzantine mirrors ruler of the early and middle period 398-1085] (in Greek). Athens: Γρηγόρη (Grigori). ISBN 9603334375.
- Plexidas, Ioannis (2007). The Prince of Photius (in Greek). Athens: Armos. ISBN 978-960-527-396-5.
- Shepard, Jonathan (2002). "Spreading the Word - Byzantine Missions". In Cyril A. Mango (ed.). The Oxford History of Byzantium. Oxford: Oxford University Press. ISBN 0-19-814098-3.
- Tatakes, Vasileios N.; Moutafakis, Nicholas J. (2003). Byzantine Philosophy. Indianapolis: Hackett Publishing Company. ISBN 0-87220-563-0.
- Taylor, Fr. Justin (1990), essay "Canon Law in the Age of the Fathers", (published in "Readings, Cases, Materials in Canon Law - A Textbook for Ministerial Students, Revised Edition", [Collegeville, Minn., The Liturgical Press] by Jordan Hite, T.O.R., and Daniel J. Ward, O.S.B.)
- Tougher, Shaun (1997). The Reign of Leo VI (886–912) - Politics and People. Leiden: Brill. ISBN 978-90-04-10811-0.
- Treadgold, Warren (October 1983). "Review - Patriarch Photius of Constantinople - His Life, Scholarly Contributions, and Correspondence together with a Translation of Fifty-Two of His Letters by Despina Stratoudaki White; The Patriarch and the Prince - The Letter of Patriarch Photius of Constantinople to Khan Boris of Bulgaria by Despina Stratoudaki White; Joseph R. Berrigan, Jr". Speculum. 58 (4). Medieval Academy of America: 1100–1102. doi:10.2307/2853829. JSTOR 2853829.
- Treadgold, Warren (1997). A History of the Byzantine State and Society. Stanford, California: Stanford University Press. ISBN 0-8047-2630-2.
- Vlyssidou, Vassiliki N. (1997). "About the Deposition of Patriarch Nicholas Mystikos (907)". Byzantine Symmeikta (in Greek). 11: 23–36.

Titles of Chalcedonian Christianity
Preceded by Ignatius	Ecumenical Patriarch of Constantinople; 858—867	Succeeded by Ignatius (2)
Preceded by Ignatius (2)	Ecumenical Patriarch of Constantinople; 877—886	Succeeded by Stephen I
