= National Doctors' Day =

National day to appreciate physicians

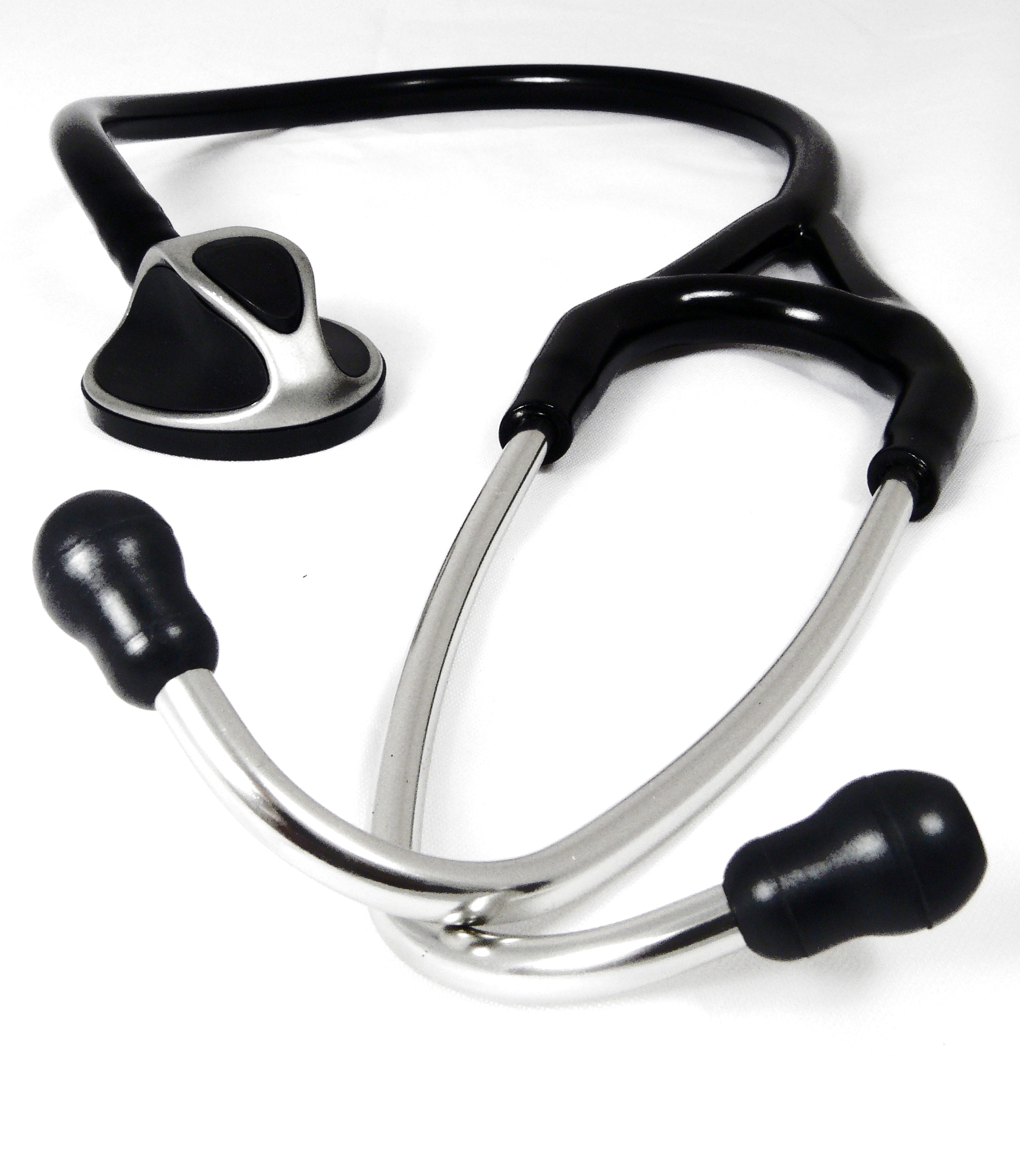
- National Doctors' Day
- Observed by: Various countries
- Significance: To recognize the contributions of physicians to individual lives and communities.
- Date: Varies with the country
- Frequency: Annual

National Doctors' Day is a day celebrated to recognize the contributions of physicians to individual lives and communities. The date varies from nation to nation depending on the event of commemoration used to mark the day. In some nations the day is marked as a holiday. Although supposed to be celebrated by patients in and benefactors of the healthcare industry, it is usually celebrated by health care organizations. Staff may organize a lunch for doctors during which physicians are presented with tokens of recognition. Historically, a card or red carnation may be sent to physicians and their spouses, along with a flower being placed on the graves of deceased physicians.

== Celebrating nations ==
Details of celebrations and dates of celebrations of the national Doctor's Day
Country	Date	Details
Australia	March 30	There are various dates on which National Doctor’s Day may be recognized, the most participated being the 30th of March.
Brazil	October 18	National Doctors' Day is celebrated as a holiday on October 18, the day on which the Catholic Church celebrates the birthday of Saint Luke. According to the Church Tradition the apostle and Evangelist Saint Luke was a doctor, as it is written in the New Testament (Colossians 4:14).
Canada	May 1	National Physicians' Day is celebrated on May 1. The date was chosen by the Canadian Medical Association in recognition of Dr. Emily Stowe, the first female physician to practice in Canada. Senate Public Bill S-248 would have officially recognised the day, but died on the order paper following the 2019 Canadian Federal Election.
China	August 19	Chinese Doctors' Day is celebrated as a national holiday on August 19 annually. The date was selected by the National Health and Family Planning Commission of the People's Republic of China (PRC) in the 2016 National Health and Wellness Conference of China and was approved by in State Council of the PRC on November 20, 2017. The significance of Chinese Doctor's Day is to recognize the great contributions of Chinese doctors to their community and society, encourage the health workers to positively advocate the noble spirit of ‘respect for life, heal the wounded and save the dying, be willing to contribute, and love without boundaries', and further promote the development of a harmony atmosphere of respect for doctors in the whole society, and accelerate the in-depth implementation of the Healthy China strategy.
Cuba	December 3	National Doctors' Day is celebrated as a holiday and commemorates the birthday of Carlos Juan Finlay (December 3, 1833 – August 6, 1915). He was a Cuban physician and scientist recognized as a pioneer in yellow fever research. He was the first to theorize, in 1881, that a mosquito was a carrier, now known as a disease vector, of the organism causing yellow fever: a mosquito that bites a victim of the disease could subsequently bite and thereby infect a healthy person. A year later Finlay identified a mosquito of the genus Aedes as the organism transmitting yellow fever. His theory was followed by the recommendation to control the mosquito population as a way to control the spread of the sickness.
Ecuador	February 21	The date honors Eugenio Espejo, the first Ecuadorian doctor, born on February 21, 1747.
El Salvador	July 14	Starting in 1969, National Doctor's Day has been celebrated, as per legislative decree, on July 14 to commemorate the day the College of Physicians of El Salvador was founded (July 14, 1943).
India	July 1	All across the country National Doctors' Day is celebrated on July 1 in memory of Dr. Bidhan Chandra Roy, physician and the first Chief Minister of West Bengal. He was born on July 1, 1882, and died on the same date in 1962.
Indonesia	October 24	Hari Dokter Nasional or National Doctor's Day. The day is also marked by the birthday celebration of the Indonesian Doctors Association (IDI).
Iran	August 23	Avicenna's birthday (Iranian date: Shahrivar 1st) is commemorated as the national day for doctors.
Israel	January 11	The date of January 11 marks the day in the year 1912 when a small group of Jewish doctors gathered in Tel-Aviv in Ottoman Palestine to found the Hebrew Medicinal Society for Jaffa and the Jaffa District, which eventually helped form the Israel Medical Association.
Kuwait	March 3	The idea of this celebration came for the Kuwaiti businesswoman Zahra Sulaiman Al-Moussawi. The date was chosen due to it being the birthday of Dr Sundus Al-Mazidi, her daughter.
Malaysia	October 10	Doctors Day is celebrated on the 10th of October every year according to Dr Kanagasabai. N. First launched by the Medical Practitioners Associations, Malaysia in 2014.
Nepal	March 4	(Nepali date Falgun 20). Since the establishment of the Nepal Medical Association, Nepal has organized this day every year. The doctor-patient communication, clinical treatment, and community-based health promotion and care is discussed.
South Africa	November 16	National Doctor's Day is celebrated every year in South Africa since 2018. Doctors’ Day is a commemorative day to acknowledge the value that doctors bring to the lives of South Africans, and to thank them for it. Doctors in South Africa are considered a national asset. The public is encouraged to show their appreciation to the dedicated and compassionate healthcare heroes who work tirelessly to safeguard South Africa's well-being.
Turkey	March 14	Has been celebrated as Medicine Day every year since 1919.
Ukraine	July, 27	The Medical Workers Day (Ukrainian: День медичних працівників, Den' medychnykh pratsivnykiv) is a professional holiday of medical staff.
United States	March 30	National Doctors' Day is a day on which the service of physicians to the nation is recognized annually. The idea came from Eudora Brown Almond, wife of Dr. Charles B. Almond, and the date chosen was the anniversary of the first use of general anesthesia in surgery. On March 30, 1842, in Jefferson, Georgia, Dr. Crawford Long used ether to anesthetize a patient, James Venable, and painlessly excised a tumor from his neck.
Vietnam	February 27	Doctor's Day was founded on February 28, 1955. The day is celebrated on February 27 or sometimes dates closest to this date.
Venezuela	March 10	Doctor's Day. This date was chosen to honor José María Vargas, who was not only an outstanding physician but also a President of the Republic of Venezuela.

== History ==
The first Doctors’ Day observance was March 28, 1933, in Winder, Georgia, United States. This first observance included the mailing of cards to the physicians and their wives, flowers placed on graves of deceased doctors, including Dr. Long, and a formal dinner in the home of Dr. and Mrs. William T. Randolph. After the Barrow County Alliance adopted Mrs. Almond's resolution to pay tribute to the doctors, the plan was presented to the Georgia State Medical Alliance in 1933 by Mrs. E. R. Harris of Winder, president of the Barrow County Alliance. On May 10, 1934, the resolution was adopted at the annual state meeting in Augusta, Georgia. The resolution was introduced to the Women's Alliance of the Southern Medical Association at its 29th annual meeting held in St. Louis, Missouri, November 19–22, 1935, by the Alliance president, Mrs. J. Bonar White. Since then, Doctors' Day has become an integral part of and synonymous with, the Southern Medical Association Alliance.

The United States Senate and House of Representatives passed S.J. RES. #366 during the 101st United States Congress, which President Bush signed on October 30, 1990 (creating Public Law 101-473), designating Doctors' Day as a national holiday to be celebrated on March 30.

Dr. Marion Mass along with Dr. Kimberly Jackson and Dr. Christina Lang applied to officially have physicians day changed to physicians week. This was accepted in March 2017.

In 2017 Physicians Working Together (PWT, founded by Dr. Kimberly Jackson) sponsored a series of articles in celebration of National Physicians week that were hosted on KevinMD. In 2018 PWT along with Openxmed sponsored a free online conference focusing on physician well being and advocacy. In 2019, PWT and Openxmed sponsored a scholarship program for medical students and residents. The week long event focuses on advocacy and supporting the physician community.
