= Michael Melissenos =

Byzantine general and aristocrat

Michael Melissenos (Greek: Μιχαὴλ Μελισσηνός) was a notable Byzantine aristocrat and general during the reign of Emperor Constantine V (r. 741–775).

== Biography ==
Michael is the first attested member of the noble Melissenos family. A favourite of Constantine V, he was given an unnamed sister of Eudokia, Constantine V's third wife, in marriage. Becoming thus a relative of the Emperor, Michael secured a prominent position in the imperial hierarchy. The couple had at least one son, Theodotos Kassiteras Melissenos, who became Patriarch of Constantinople in 815–821 as Theodotos I.

In 766/767, as part of a major reshuffle intended to place reliable and pro-iconoclast people in positions of authority, Constantine V appointed Michael as the strategos of the Anatolic Theme, at the time the Byzantine Empire's most important and powerful military post. Possibly at this time he received the dignity of patrikios, with which he is designated in the Chronicle of Theophanes the Confessor. In 771, Michael took part in an expedition against an Abbasid raid into Isauria. His troops, however, were heavily defeated, and unable to prevent the looting of the region. Nothing further is known of him.

== Sources ==
- Bury, John Bagnell (1911). The Imperial Administrative System of the Ninth Century - With a Revised Text of the Kletorologion of Philotheos. London: Oxford University Press.
- Kazhdan, Alexander, ed. (1991). The Oxford Dictionary of Byzantium. Oxford and New York: Oxford University Press. ISBN 0-19-504652-8.
- Lilie, Ralph-Johannes; Ludwig, Claudia; Pratsch, Thomas; Zielke, Beate (2000). "Michael Melissenos (#5029)". Prosopographie der mittelbyzantinischen Zeit: 1. Abteilung (641–867), Band 3: Leon (# 4271) – Placentius (# 6265) (in German). Berlin and Boston: De Gruyter. pp. 274–275. ISBN 978-3-11-016673-6.
- Rochow, Ilse (1994). Kaiser Konstantin V. (741–775). Materialien zu seinem Leben und Nachleben (in German). Frankfurt am Main: Peter Lang. ISBN 3-631-47138-6.
