= Medical Workers Day =

Professional holiday for healthcare workers in Ukraine

Medical Workers Day (Ukrainian: День медичних працівників, romanized: Den' Medychnykh Pratsivnykiv) is a professional holiday for healthcare workers in Ukraine. According to Decree of the President of Ukraine of June 13, 2023, No. 327/2023 "On Medical Workers Day", it is celebrated annually on July 27.

== History ==
Until 2022, Ukraine celebrated the Medical Worker Day holiday annually on the third Sunday of June. This holiday was established in 1980 in the USSR and re-approved by Decree of the President of Ukraine No. 281/94 "On Medical Worker Day" dated June 3, 1994.

Medical Workers Day holiday was established "Taking into account the importance of the healthcare sector and the contribution of its employees to the vital interests of a person, society and the state, testifying to the dedication of medical workers to the provision of medical care, preservation of health and saving lives, in support of the initiative of the Ministry of Health".

== See also ==
- International Nurses Day
- National Doctors' Day
