= Theodotus I of Constantinople =

Ecumenical Patriarch of Constantinople from 815 to 821

- Ecumenical Patriarch of Constantinople
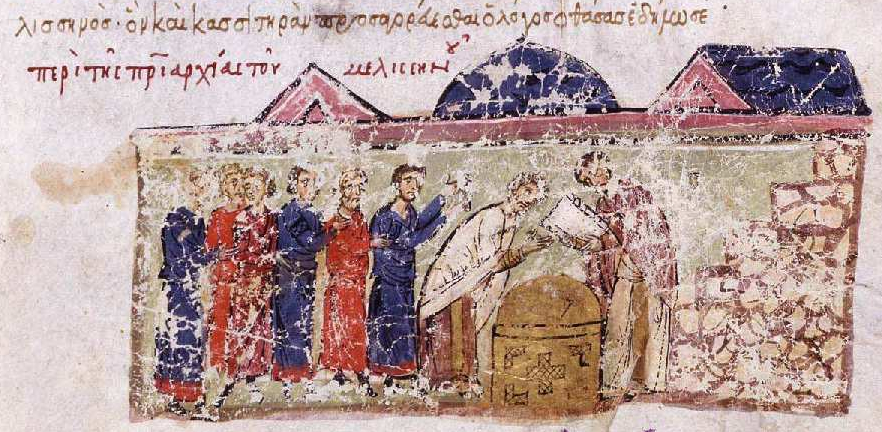
- Consecration of Theodotus Melissenos as patriarch of Constantinople, miniature from the Madrid Skylitzes
- Church: Iconoclast, previously Chalcedonian Christianity
- Installed: 1 April 815
- Term ended: c. January 821
- Predecessor: Nicephorus I of Constantinople
- Successor: Antony I of Constantinople

Personal details
- Born: Theodotus Melissenos Nakoleia
- Died: January 821
- Parents: Michael Melissenos

Theodotus I of Constantinople ou Theodotos I Kassiteras, latinised as Theodotus I Cassiteras (Greek: Θεόδοτος Κασσιτερᾶς or Κασσιτηρᾶς; fl. 813 - died January 821) was the Ecumenical Patriarch of Constantinople from 1 April 815 to January 821.

Theodotus was born in Nakoleia, as the son of the patrician Michael Melissenos by the sister of Eudokia, the last wife of Emperor Constantine V. Theodotus had become attached to the court bureaucracy and was a confidant of Emperor Michael I Rangabe.

By the time Michael I Rangabe was deposed by Leo V the Armenian in 813, Theodotus I was an elderly spatharokandidatos, whom the near-contemporary Scriptor Incertus describes as "meek" and "uneducated". On 14 March 815, Leo V forced the resignation of Patriarch Nicephorus I of Constantinople, and appointed the pro-iconoclast Theodotus Melissenos in his place. Later in 815, the new patriarch presided over a Church council in Constantinople, which overturned the Second Council of Nicaea and reinstated the ban on the veneration of icons, thus beginning the second period of Byzantine Iconoclasm. Much of the Iconoclast effort in the council was driven by other clerics, including the later Patriarchs Antony I of Constantinople and John VII of Constantinople. In the aftermath of this synod Theodotus I is representing as torturing by starvation at more than one iconodule abbot in an attempt to force them into agreement with his ecclesiastical policy.

He ceases to be mentioned in the sources after the murder of Leo V and accession of Michael II in December 820.

== Bibliography ==
- Bury, John Bagnell (1912), A History of the Eastern Roman Empire from the Fall of Irene to the Accession of Basil I (802–867 AD), London: Macmillan Publishers.
- Kazhdan, Alexander, ed. (1991). The Oxford Dictionary of Byzantium. Oxford and New York: Oxford University Press. ISBN 0-19-504652-8.
- Treadgold, Warren (1988). The Byzantine Revival, 780–842. Stanford, California: Stanford University Press. ISBN 978-0-8047-1462-4.

Titles of Chalcedonian Christianity
Preceded by Nicephorus I	Ecumenical Patriarch of Constantinople; 815 – 821	Succeeded by Antony I
