= Antonios Melissenos =

- Αντώνιος Μελισσηνός
- Died: 1899; Lixouri, Kefalonia
- Occupations: Lawer, Poet
- Family: Melissenos

Antonios Melissinos (?-Lixouri, 1899) was a Greek lawyer and poet from Lixouri, Kefalonia. He was distinguished for his patriotic and occasional speeches, and he left a strong mark in the field of Greek national poetry and music.

== Works ==
He set to music the dances from his poetic one-act drama Τα βουνίσια παλληκάρια (The Mountain Braves). For many years, especially during the era of the Radicals, he was renowned for the dance Τα ρόδα τα τριαντάφυλλα (The Roses, the Red Roses), which became well known throughout the Ionian Islands and later spread to the rest of Greece as a folk song, with the addition and variation of verses.

He published the following literary works:

- Η σταφιδούλα (The Little Currant), a long poem (1850, Kefalonia).
- A Rita Gaburi, published in Italy.
- A number of national and romantic asmata (lyrical poems), included in a collection titled Euphrosyne, published in 1852 by Theodoros Pefanis in Kefalonia.

However, according to the historian Ilias Tsitselis, several of Melissinos' works were never published and remain, to this day, in the possession of the families of Angelos Melissinos and Charalambos Charitatos.
