= Anthousa of Mantinea =

Saint Anthousa of Mantinea

Venerable Abbess and Confessor
- Died: 759; Constantinople (modern-day Istanbul, Turkey)
- Venerated in: Eastern Orthodox Church
- Feast: 27 July

Saint Anthousa of Mantinea (Greek: Ανθούσα Μαντίνειας), also spelt Anthusa was an anchoress and abbess in Constantinople during the 8th century.

Anthousa became an ascetic at a young age, living in the mountains near Constantinople in complete solitude. She later founded two monasteries, one for men and the other for women, and became abbess of the monastery for nuns, 90 of whom resided there and who "were known for their obedience to their abbess and for their spiritual discipline". She openly defied Emperor Constantine V's iconoclastic prohibitions, so she, her nuns, and her nephew, who was abbot of the second monastery, were arrested and tortured. When Anthousa correctly prophesied that the emperor's wife, Eudokia, who was close to death from childbirth, would safely deliver twins, a boy and a girl, the empress intervened. Anthousa's life was spared, and the empress donated several estates to her. The empress' daughter was likely named after Anthousa and also became a saint, donating all of her wealth to charity and protecting many orphans and widows.

Anthousa returned to her monastery, where she lived to old age. She died in 759 and was buried in her cell. Her feast day is 27 July.

== Bibliography ==
=== Primary Sources ===
- Constas, Nicholas (1998). “Life of St. Anthousa, Daughter of Constantine V: introduction and translation by Nicholas Constas”. In Talbot, Alice-Mary (ed.). Byzantine Defenders of Images: Eight Saints’ Lives in English Translation. Washington DC: Dumbarton Oaks, pp. 21-24.
- Talbot, Alice-Mary (1998). “Life of St. Anthousa of Mantineon: introduction and translation by Alice-Mary Talbot”. In Talbot, Alice-Mary (ed.). Byzantine Defenders of Images: Eight Saints’ Lives in English Translation. Washington DC: Dumbarton Oaks. pp. 13-19.

=== Secondary Sources ===
- Dunbar, Agnes B. C. (1901). A Dictionary of Saintly Women. Vol 1. London: George Bell & Sons. p. 76.
- Kaplan, Michael (2020). "The Economy of Byzantine Monasteries". In Beach, Alison I.; Cochelin, Isabelle (eds.). The Cambridge History of Medieval Monasticism in the Latin West. New York: Cambridge University Press. p. 345. ISBN 978-1108770637.
- Kazhdan, A. P.; Talbot, A.-M. (1991–1992). "Women and Iconoclasm". Byzantinische Zeitschrift. 84–85 (1–2): 391–408. doi:10.1515/bz-1992-1-239.
- "Venerable Anthusa, Abbess of Mantinea in Asia Minor, and her 90 sisters". Orthodox Church in America.
- Watkins, Basil (2015). The Book of Saints: A Comprehensive Biographical Dictionary (8th ed.). London: Bloomsbury Publishing. ISBN 978-0-567-66415-0.
