= Arshavir =

Arshavir (Armenian: Արշավիր (reformed); Արշաւիր (classical), pronounced [ɑɾʃɑˈviɾ]) is an ancient Armenian name of Iranian origin. Philologist Heinrich Hübschmann interprets the name as being composed of the Avestan words aršan 'man, male' and vīra 'man'. According to another interpretation, the name means 'virile' and comes from Persian.

This name is related to the family of the 9th-century Patriarch of Constantinople, Photius. Photius' mother Irene was the sister of Arshavir, who had married Calomaria, the sister of Caesar Bardas and the empress Theodora. Arshavir, Photius' uncle, is often confused with Arshavir, the brother of John the Grammarian.

== People with the name ==
- Arshavir Shirakian (1900–1973), Armenian writer
