= Anthousa, Kozani =

Anthousa Ανθούσα
- Community
- Location within Greece
- Coordinates: 40.25406°N 21.20778°E
- Country: Greece
- Administrative region: Western Macedonia
- Regional unit: Kozani
- Municipality: Voio
- Municipal unit: Tsotyli

Population (2021)
  - Community: 26
- Time zone: UTC+2 (EET)
  - Summer (DST): UTC+3 (EEST)

Anthousa (Greek: Ανθούσα, before 1928: Ρέζνα – Rezna), is a small town in the municipal unit of Tsotyli, Kozani regional unit, Greece.

Rezna was a mixed village and a part of its population were Greek speaking Muslim Vallahades. The 1920 Greek census recorded 380 people in the village, and 340 inhabitants (60 families) were Muslim in 1923. Following the Greek–Turkish population exchange, Greek refugee families in Rezna were from Pontus (35) in 1926. The 1928 Greek census recorded 241 village inhabitants. In 1928, the refugee families numbered 35 (130 people).
