= Neil King Jr. =

American journalist and author (1959–2024)

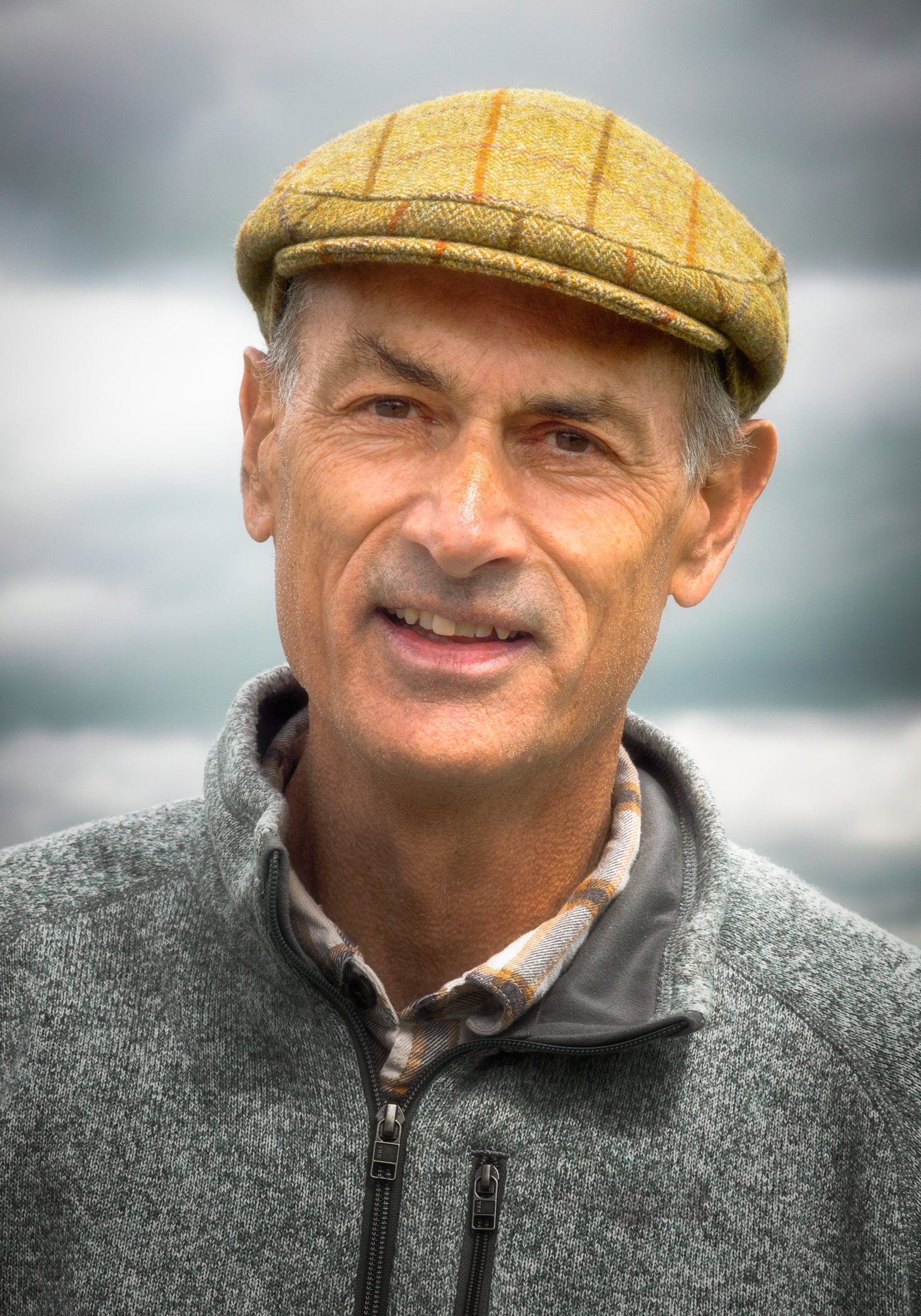
- King in 2022
- Born: Neil Caldwell King Jr. July 27, 1959; Boulder, Colorado, U.S.
- Died: September 17, 2024 (aged 65); Washington, D.C., U.S.
- Education: Columbia University (BA); Northwestern University (MA)
- Occupations: Journalist; author
- Spouse: Shailagh Murray
- Children: 2
- Awards: Pulitzer Prize for Breaking News Reporting (2002)

Neil Caldwell King Jr. (July 27, 1959 – September 17, 2024) was an American journalist and author. He shared in the Pulitzer Prize for Breaking News Reporting in 2002. His first book, American Ramble: A Walk of Memory and Renewal, was published by HarperCollins in 2023.

== Background and early life ==
King was born in Boulder, Colorado, on July 27, 1959, into a family that settled in Colorado in the 1870s. His great grandfather, Alfred Rufus King, was mayor of Delta, Colorado, and later served as a judge on the Colorado Court of Appeals. His grandfather, Edward King, was the longtime dean of the University of Colorado Law School.

Neil King attended Northwestern University and later graduated with a philosophy B.A. from Columbia University. He earned a master’s degree in journalism from Northwestern.

== Journalistic career and awards ==
King started his journalism career in 1990 as a Washington, D.C.-based stringer for the Great Falls Tribune, covering topics such as land use disputes. In the early 1990s he also worked at the Tampa Tribune and then the Prague Post in the Czech Republic.

In 1993, King became an East European correspondent for the Wall Street Journal, the start of a 23-year career at the Journal, most of it in Washington, DC. In Washington, King served as chief diplomatic correspondent, national political reporter, and finally as the paper’s global economics editor before leaving the paper in 2016.

In 2002, King shared in the Pulitzer Prize for Breaking News Reporting, awarded to The Wall Street Journal's staff for coverage of the Sept. 11 terrorist attack on the United States. King and co-author David S. Cloud were recognized for their article "U.S. Vows Retaliation as Attention Focuses on bin Laden."

In 2012, King shared in a Gerald Loeb award for online enterprise reporting, reflecting his role in creating the Wall Street Journal's Jet Tracker Database, a service monitoring private planes' activity.

== American Ramble ==
In 2023, King published American Ramble, a book chronicling his 330-mile walk through backroads parts of the countryside between Washington D.C. and New York City. Washington Post reviewer Marianne Szegedy-Maszak hailed King for combining "a veteran reporter's sharp curiosity and a historian’s discernment."

King wrote the book at age 61, after surviving esophageal cancer. On CBS's Sunday Morning program, host Jane Pauley described the book as the tale of "a man who went on ramble and discovered America along the way."

== Personal life and death ==
In 2022, King and journalist Tyler Maroney used canoes at night to cross all seven bodies of water in New York City's Central Park. The New Yorker described the two as "urban Shackletons" and chronicled their unauthorized trip in the magazine's Explorers Club section.

King was married to Shailagh Murray and had two daughters. They lived in Washington D.C.

King died from complications from esophageal cancer in Washington D.C., on September 17, 2024. He was 65.
