= John VII of Constantinople =

Ecumenical Patriarch of Constantinople from 837 to 843

- Ecumenical Patriarch of Constantinople
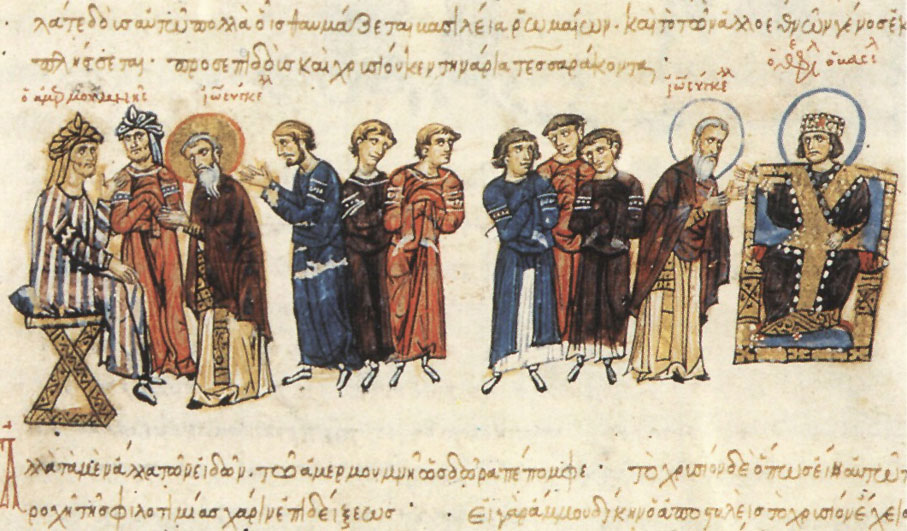
- The embassy of John VII in 829, between Emperor Theophilos (right) and Caliph Al-Ma'mun, from the Madrid Skylitzes
- Installed: 21 January 837
- Term ended: 4 March 843
- Predecessor: Antony I of Constantinople
- Successor: Methodius I of Constantinople

Personal details
- Born: John Morocharzanios
- Died: Before 867
- Denomination: Iconoclast after 814, previously Chalcedonian Christianity

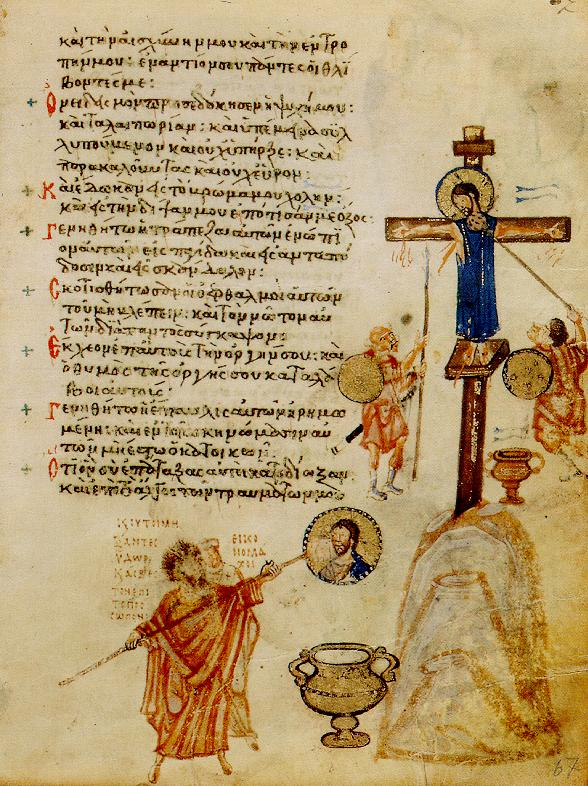
Page of the iconodule Chludov Psalter. illustrates the line "They gave me gall to eat; and when I was thirsty they gave me vinegar to drink" with a picture of a soldier offering Christ vinegar on a sponge attached to a pole. John VII of Constantinople is depicted rubbing out a painting of Christ with a similar sponge attached to a pole. John VII is caricatured, here as on other pages, with untidy straight hair sticking out in all directions, which was considered ridiculous by the Byzantines.

John VII of Constantinople, known as John the Grammarian (Greek: Ἰωάννης Γραμματικός, romanized: Iōánnēs Grammatikos; died before 867), was Ecumenical Patriarch of Constantinople from 21 January 837 to 4 March 843, died before 867. He was known for his great learning (hence the epithet Grammatikos) and for his rhetorical skills. He was a supporter of iconoclasm, and before his patriarchate he played a role in its restoration at the church council of 815. Under Michael II (r. 820–829), he tutored the future emperor Theophilos (r. 829–842) and is credited with instilling strong iconoclastic sympathies in his pupil.

As emperor, Theophilos appointed John to the patriarchal throne. Very little about John's patriarchate is known. He was deposed in 843 as a prelude to the end of iconoclasm. He was vilified as a "sorcerer" in iconodule sources, and debates with him became a popular literary topos in hagiographies.

== Origin and family ==
As John is the subject of numerous attacks in the orthodox iconodule tradition, it is difficult to determine the veracity of information about him. He was born in Constantinople into a family whose name is variously recorded as Morokardanios, Morocharzamios, and Morocharzianos. Paul Lemerle places his birth in the 770s, while Warren Treadgold gives 785 as his year of birth.

A number of scholars assert that John was of Armenian origin, although this has been disputed by others. Anthony Kaldellis writes, "No source calls [John] an Armenian, gives him an Armenian ancestry, or claims that he consorted with Armenians, even though that would have been a convenient way to portray him as a sinister outsider in the polemic that was later directed against him by Iconophiles". On the contrary, the hostile source Theophanes Continuatus writes of him, "He was not a foreigner or a recent arrival, but a true native offspring of this Queen of Cities [i.e. Constantinople]".

John's brother was named Arsaber, which is an Armenian name (Arshavir). Warren Treadgold identifies John's brother with the Arsaber who married a sister of Empress Theodora, wife of Emperor Theophilos. John's father's name is recorded as Pankratios, which, per Juan Signes Codoñer, corresponds to Armenian Bagrat, although Kaldellis observes that the source that records his father's name "is clearly trying to link the warlock-patriarch to a famous astrologer of the eighth century with the same name" (John is depicted as a sorcerer in iconodule texts). John's father is described as a skiastes, a word of uncertain meaning apparently denoting his profession. It may mean that he was an artisan involved in the production of textiles; alternatively, it may have been a nickname referring to some magical practices. John's sister Irene was the mother of the future Patriarch Photios I of Constantinople.

== Career ==
John began his clerical career c. 811–813 as a lector (anagnostes) in the monastery of Hodegon. According to Patriarch Photios I, he was also a painter of icons. He corresponded with Theodore the Studite, whose three letters to John are evidence that the future patriarch was originally an iconodule. By 814 John had become an iconoclast, and Emperor Leo V the Armenian chose him to head a committee to collect patristic texts supporting this theological position in preparation for the church council of 815, which reinstated iconoclasm. John was rewarded for his efforts by being appointed abbot (hegoumenos) of the prestigious monastery of Sergius and Bacchus (now the Little Hagia Sophia), where recalcitrant iconodules were re-educated.

John was known for his learning (hence his nickname Grammatikos) and for his persuasive rhetoric in the endless debates that are a favorite subject of hagiographic sources reflecting the second period of the Iconoclasm. John was also charged with tutoring the future Emperor Theophilos during the reign of his father, Michael II, and is credited with instilling strong iconoclastic sympathies in his pupil. Upon Theophilos' accession, John was appointed synkellos (assistant to the patriarch), a position that made him a likely heir to the patriarchate. Probably in 829 or 830, John was sent on an embassy to the Abbasid caliph al-Ma'mun, but this did little to prevent a period of fierce warfare between the Byzantine Empire and the Abbasids. According to one tradition, he convinced Theophilos to convert the palace of Bryas into an Arabian palace and personally participated in this project.

The circumstances of John VII's patriarchate are unclear. Appointed patriarch (possibly on 21 January 837) by his disciple Theophilos, he may have been responsible for a slight increase in the persecution of the iconodules. He was deposed in 843 by Theophilos' widow, Theodora, his own relative, as a prelude to the end of iconoclasm. The deposed patriarch survived until the 860s.

== Notes and references ==
=== Bibliography ===
- Alexander, Paul J. (1958). The Patriarch Nicephorus of Constantinople: Ecclesiastical Policy and Image Worship in the Byzantine Empire. Oxford: Clarendon Press.
- Bury, J. B. (1912). A History of the Eastern Roman Empire from the Fall of Irene to the Accession of Basil I (A.D. 802–867). London: Macmillan.
- Charanis, Peter (1963). The Armenians in the Byzantine Empire. Lisbon: Calouste Gulbenkian Foundation.
- Kaldellis, Anthony (2019). Romanland: Ethnicity and Empire in Byzantium. Cambridge, MA: Harvard University Press. ISBN 978-0-674-23968-5.
- Lemerle, Paul (1986) [French orig. published 1971]. Byzantine Humanism: The First Phase. Byzantina Australiensia 3. Translated by Helen Lindsay and Ann Moffatt. Canberra: Australian Association for Byzantine Studies. ISBN 978-0-9593626-3-3.
- Signes Codoñer, Juan (2014). The Emperor Theophilos and the East, 829–842: Court and Frontier in Byzantium During the Last Phase of Iconoclasm. Farnham, Surrey: Ashgate. ISBN 978-0-7546-6489-5.
- Talbot, Alice-Mary; Cutler, Anthony (1991). "John VII Grammatikos". In Kazhdan, Alexander (ed.). The Oxford Dictionary of Byzantium. Vol. 2. Oxford and New York: Oxford University Press. p. 1052. ISBN 0-19-504652-8.
- Treadgold, Warren T. (1988). The Byzantine Revival, 780–842. Stanford University Press. ISBN 978-0-8047-1462-4.
- Treadgold, Warren (2002). "Photius Before His Patriarchate". The Journal of Ecclesiastical History. 53 (1): 1–17. doi:10.1017/S0022046901008727. ISSN 0022-0469.

Titles of Chalcedonian Christianity
Preceded by Antony I	Ecumenical Patriarch of Constantinople; 837 – 843	Succeeded by Methodius I
