= Anthusa of Constantinople =

Saint Anthusa of Constantinople
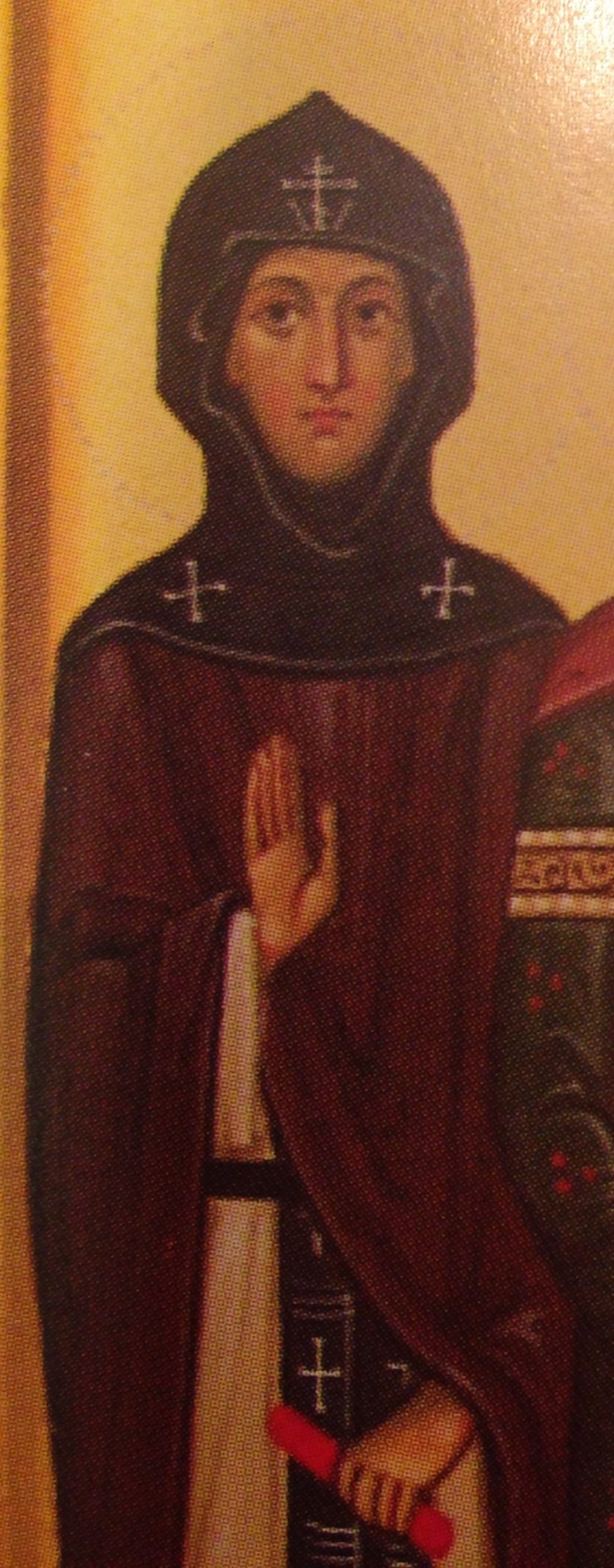
- An icon of Anthusa of Constantinople
- Born: 750 or 757 AD; Constantinople, Byzantine Empire
- Died: 801 or 808 AD (aged 51 or 57); Byzantine Empire
- Venerated in: Eastern Orthodox Church; Roman Catholic Church
- Feast: 18 April (Catholic) and 12 & 18 April (Orthodox)

Anthusa of Constantinople (Greek: Ανθούσα) commonly known as Saint Anthusa of Constantinople and in Orthodox usage as Saint Anthousa the Younger (750 or 757 – 801 or 808 AD) is a saint venerated in the Eastern Orthodox Church and the Catholic Church. Anthusa's feast days in the Orthodox Church are 12 and 18 April, while her feast in the Catholic Church is 18 April. In the Catholic Church, Anthusa is patroness of convents and abbeys. She was the daughter of Byzantine Emperor Constantine V.

== Life ==
=== Childhood ===
During a campaign in Paphlagonia, Emperor Constantine V summoned the abbess Anthusa of Mantinea (Saint Anthousa the Elder), whom he had tortured earlier for venerating icons, and asked for her prayers due to the difficulty of the empress' pregnancy. The abbess predicted the birth of twins, and the daughter was named in her honor.

Anthusa of Constantinople was the daughter of the iconoclast Byzantine Emperor Constantine V and one of his wives. Details about Anthusa's birth are uncertain. According to one source, she and her brother, the future Emperor Leo the Khazar, were twins born on 25 January 750 to Constantine's first wife (i.e. Tzitzak), while another states that she was born in 757, a date which would make Eudokia her mother and rule out the possibility of being a twin, given that it is known for certain that Leo was born on the former date.

=== Religious life ===
When Anthusa became of age, her father urged her to marry. However, Anthusa desired monasticism and did not follow the emperor's orders. After the death of her father, Anthusa used all her personal property to help the poor and the orphaned. The devout Empress Irene, Leo's consort and therefore Anthusa's sister-in-law, regarded Anthusa highly and invited her to be her co-regent during the minority of Constantine VI. However, Anthusa declined the offer. At court, she wore clothes befitting her position as the late emperor's daughter, but underneath her elaborate clothes, she wore a hair-shirt.

Anthusa entered the monastery of Saint Euthymia. She was later tonsured by Patriarch Tarasios of Constantinople, and she founded the Omonoia Monastery ("omonoia" means 'concord' or 'charity') in Constantinople, which became known for its strict regulations.

=== Death ===
According to one source, Anthusa lived to the age of fifty-two, and died in 801 AD. Other sources claim that she died in 808 at the age of fifty-seven.
