= Council of Constantinople (815) =

Iconoclast synod held in Constantinople, 815

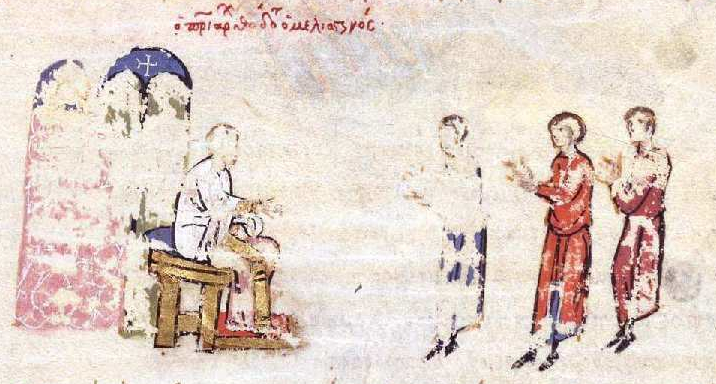
Patriarch Theodotos I presides over the council, miniature from the Madrid Skylitzes

The Council of Constantinople of 815 was held in the Byzantine capital, in the Hagia Sophia, and initiated the second period of the Byzantine Iconoclasm.

== Background ==
The Ecumenical Council of Nicaea or Second Council of Nicaea (787) allowed icon veneration. However, there were monks at the Studion Monastery in Constantinople who were iconoclasts (opposed to icons).

== History ==
Shortly before it convened, the iconophile Patriarch Nikephoros I was deposed by Emperor Leo V the Armenian (813-820) in favour of the iconoclast Theodotos I (patriarch from 815-821). Theodotos presided over the council, which reinstated iconoclasm, repudiating the Second Council of Nicaea and reaffirming the decisions of the Council of Hieria of 754. Although the meeting had been convened at the behest of the iconoclast Emperor, much of the Iconoclast effort was driven by other clerics, including the later patriarchs Antony I and John VII. In the aftermath of this synod Theodotos is represented as torturing by starvation more than one iconodule abbot in an attempt to force them into agreement with his ecclesiastical policy.
