= Björn Dreyer (footballer, born 1989) =

German footballer and coach

Personal information
- Date of birth: 17 January 1989 (age 37)
- Place of birth: Osterode am Harz, West Germany
- Height: 1.85 m (6 ft 1 in)
- Position: Defender

Team information
- Current team: SV Werder Bremen U15 (Manager)

Youth career
- –2003: VfR Osterode
- 2003–2008: Werder Bremen

Senior career*
| Years | Team | Apps | (Gls) |
| 2008–2009 | Werder Bremen II | 2 | (0) |
| 2009–2010 | FC Oberneuland | 23 | (3) |
| 2010–2013 | TuS Heeslingen | 59 | (4) |
| Total | | 84 | (7) |

Managerial career
- 2012–2013: Werder Bremen U13 (assistant)
- 2013–2014: Eintracht Braunschweig U13
- 2014–2015: Eintracht Braunschweig U16
- 2015–: Werder Bremen (youth)
- * Club domestic league appearances and goals

Björn Dreyer (born 17 January 1989) is a German football coach and former player. He works at SV Werder Bremen as a youth team coach.
