= Chinese Doctors' Day =

Public holiday in China

- Observed by: China
- Significance: Day to commemorate doctors in China
- Date: 19 August
- Next time: 19 August 2026
- Frequency: Annual
- First time: 2016

The Chinese Doctors' Day is a commemorative day for doctors in the People's Republic of China that is observed annually on August 19.

== History ==
The National Health and Family Planning Commission announced the establishment of this festival at the National Health and Wellness Conference on August 19, 2016, and it was approved by the State Council on November 20, 2017. According to the person in charge of the National Health and Family Planning Commission, the festival "encourages the vast number of health and wellness workers to vigorously promote the noble spirit of 'respecting life, healing the wounded and rescuing the dying, being willing to dedicate themselves, and having boundless love,' further promotes the formation of a good atmosphere of respecting doctors and valuing health in the whole society, and accelerates the in-depth implementation of the Healthy China strategy". On August 20, 2021, the Standing Committee of the National People's Congress adopted the "Physician Law of the People's Republic of China". Article 5 of the law states that "August 19th of each year is Chinese Doctors' Day".
