= Francesco Gaeta (poet) =

Italian poet

Francesco Gaeta (1879 – 15 April 1927) was an Italian poet, writer and a journalist for Italian newspapers.

His early works were initially influenced by Gabriele D'Annunzio, and were characterized by a sentimental and sensual mood. His language featured both refined and popular elements. His friend Benedetto Croce, "highly rated" his work in Sonetti voluttuosi ed altre poesie and Poesie d'amore, which "combines visual sensitivity with a high degree of musicality".

After his mother died, he accompanied her to the cemetery, saw her buried, returned home, wrote on a piece of paper "Sweet mother, I follow you" and killed himself.

== Selected works ==
- Il libro della giovinezza (1895)
- Sonetti voluttuosi e altre poesie (1906)
- Salvatore Di Giacomo (1911, essay)
- Poesie d'amore (1920)
