= Björn Dreyer (footballer, born 1977) =

German footballer

Personal information
- Date of birth: 27 July 1977 (age 49)
- Place of birth: Hamburg, West Germany
- Height: 1.90 m (6 ft 3 in)
- Position: Midfielder

Youth career
- Hummelsbüttler SV
- –1997: SV Bergstedt

Senior career*
Years	Team	Apps	(Gls)
1997–1998	SC Concordia von 1907		
1998–1999	1. SC Norderstedt	30	(0)
1999–2001	SC Freiburg (A)	10	(1)
1999–2001	SC Freiburg	9	(1)
2001–2002	Stuttgarter Kickers	11	(1)
Total		60	(3)
- * Club domestic league appearances and goals

Björn Dreyer (born 27 July 1977) is a German former professional footballer who played as a midfielder.

== Career ==
Dreyer made his debut in the Bundesliga for SC Freiburg on 28 August 1999 when he came on as a substitute in the 76th minute in a game against 1860 Munich.
