= Eudokia (wife of Constantine V) =

Third empress consort of Constantine V

- Augusta

Empress of the Byzantine Empire
- Tenure: c. 751 – c. 775
- Coronation: 1 April 769
- Born: 8th century
- Died: 8th century
- Spouse: Constantine V
- Issue: Nikephoros, Christopher, Niketas, Anthimos, Evdokimos, Saint Anthousa the Younger
Names
- Eudokia (Ευδοκία)
- Dynasty: Isaurian Dynasty

Eudokia (Greek: Εὐδοκία) was the third empress consort of Constantine V of the Byzantine Empire. According to the chronicle of Theophanes the Confessor, Eudokia was a sister-in-law of Michael Melissenos, strategos of the Anatolikon Theme. Her sister and brother-in-law were parents to Theodotus I of Constantinople.

== Empress ==
Constantine V was Emperor since 741. His first wife Tzitzak gave birth to their only known son, Leo IV the Khazar, on 25 January 750. There is no further mention of her and by the following year, Constantine was already married to his second wife Maria. Lynda Garland has suggested Tzitzak died in childbirth.

Maria died childless not long after her own marriage.

Though the year of the marriage of Constantine and Eudokia is not known, it can be placed between late 751 and 769. According to Theophanes, on 1 April 769, Constantine named her an Augusta. The following day two of her sons were named Caesars and a third made nobilissimus, which would place the ceremony several years following their marriage.

It was recorded about her coronation:

in this year the thrice-married emperor crowned his wife Eudocia as his third Augusta in the Tribunal of the Nineteen Couches on 1 April, a Saturday. And the two [eldest] sons he had by her, Christopher and Nicephorus, he appointed Caesars in the same Tribunal on the next day, which was 2 April and Easter Sunday... He likewise placed a golden mantle and a crown upon their youngest brother Nicetas, whom he appointed nobilissimus.

Theophanes points out the existence of a three-times-married emperor as unusual. On the occasion of the marriage of Leo VI the Wise to his own third wife Eudokia Baïana in 899, George Alexandrovič Ostrogorsky points that a third marriage was technically illegal under Byzantine law and against the practices of the Eastern Orthodox Church at the time. This would presumably also affect the legality of Eudokia's marriage.

Constantine was a fervent iconoclast and specifically targeted monasteries as strongholds of Iconodule sentiment. However, Eudokia is recorded as a generous benefactor of the monastery of St. Anthusa of Mantineon and even named a daughter after its patron saint, which indicates Eudokia may not have shared his religious views. Constantine was campaigning against Telerig of Bulgaria when he died on 14 September 775. Whether Eudokia survived her husband or not is unclear.

== Children ==
Eudokia and Constantine V had six known children:

- Nikephoros. Named Caesar in 769. Theophanes records him involved in various plots against Emperors. First in May 776 against his older half-brother Leo IV the Khazar. He was punished via flogging and exile. Second in September 780 against his sister-in-law, Empress-regent Irene. He was exiled to a monastery. Third in August 792 against his nephew Constantine VI. He was blinded and placed in confinement within an imperial residence. Fourth in October 797 against Irene who had deposed her son. He was exiled to her native Athens. Fifth in 812 against Michael I Rangabe. His new place of exile was Aphousia, in the Sea of Marmara. He does not seem to resurface.
- Christopher. Presumed to be the second son. Named Caesar in 769. Theophanes records him supporting his brother in various plots. Exiled to a monastery in 780. His tongue was cut in 792. He was blinded in 799.
- Niketas. Presumed to be the third son. Named nobilissimus in 769. Theophanes records him supporting his brother in various plots. Exiled to a monastery in 780. His tongue was cut in 792. He was blinded in 799.
- Anthimos. Presumed to be the fourth son. Named nobilissimus by his half-brother Leo IV in 775. Exiled to a monastery in 780. His tongue was cut in 792. He was blinded in 799.
- Evdokimos. Presumed to be the fifth son. Named nobilissimus by his half-brother Leo IV in 775. Exiled to a monastery in 780. His tongue was cut in 792. He was blinded in 799.
- Saint Anthousa the Younger (757–809). A pious nun, refused offer to share regency with Irene during the minority of Constantine VI.

Royal titles
Preceded by Maria	Byzantine Empress consort c. 751–775	Succeeded by Irene of Athens
