= Theophilos Kourkouas =

10th-century Byzantine general

- Relatives: John Kourkouas, Romanos Kourkouas, John Tzimiskes
- Military career
- Allegiance: Byzantine Empire
- Service years: ca. 923–960s
- Rank: strategos of Chaldia, Mesopotamia (?) and Theodosiopolis, Domestic of the Schools (?)

Theophilos Kourkouas (Greek: Θεόφιλος Κουρκούας, fl. ca. 920–960s) was a distinguished Byzantine general in the 10th century. He was also the grandfather of the Byzantine emperor John I Tzimiskes (r. 969–976).

== Biography ==
Theophilos was a scion of the Kourkouas family, a clan of Armenian origin that had established itself as one of the chief families among the Anatolian military aristocracy by the early 10th century. His father was likely called Romanos, and he was possibly the grandson of John Kourkouas the Elder, who served as commander of the Hikanatoi regiment and conspired against Emperor Basil I (r. 867–886) in the 870s. Theophilos is probably to be identified with the person referred to in contemporary Arabic and Armenian sources as ash-Shamīshāq or Ch‘mšshik respectively, indicating that he already bore the surname or sobriquet of Tzimiskes, which was famously borne by his grandson, the Emperor John I Tzimiskes (r. 969–976). Although the Byzantine sources insist that this surname was given exclusively to the later emperor, and that it derived from the Armenian word for a type of small reddish sandals worn by women in the East, it may well have derived from the river and homonymous town of Chimichgezek in the southern portion of the theme of Mesopotamia, where presumably Theophilos was active, perhaps as the local strategos (military governor).

Theophilos was the younger brother of the celebrated general John Kourkouas, who was appointed as Domestic of the Schools (i.e. supreme commander of the imperial armies) in circa 923 by Emperor Romanos Lekapenos (r. 920–944) and served in this post for 22 years. Theophilos is first mentioned in 923, when along with his brother he suppressed of the revolt of the strategos of Chaldia, Bardas Boilas. He succeeded the defeated rebel as governor of this strategically important province until ca. 940. From 927 on, when John Kourkouas launched continuous campaigns against the neighbouring Muslim border emirates, Theophilos assisted him ably, especially in the direction of Armenia, and emerged as his brother's chief aide and lieutenant. The history of Theophanes Continuatus lauds his excellence and valour, comparing his exploits in Upper Mesopotamia with the achievements of Justinian I's general Solomon.

According to the De administrando imperio, from Chaldia Theophilos launched raids into the region of Phasiane, i.e. the eastern portions of the emirate of Qaliqala or Theodosiopolis (modern Erzurum). At an unknown point he also secured the submission of the Emirate of Avnik, whose ruler was obliged to send his son as a hostage to Constantinople.

Theodosiopolis finally fell in September 949, after seven months of siege. Theophilos was named strategos of the new theme of Theodosiopolis, and held the office at least until 952. His fate thereafter is not known in detail, except for a brief mention in Theophanes Continuatus that he held the rank of magistros and the post of Domestic of the Schools under Nikephoros II Phokas (r. 963–969), possibly as an honorary appointment; according to Lisa Andriollo however this is a misinterpretation of the text, which actually refers to John Tzimiskes.

Theophilos's unnamed son married the sister of Nikephoros Phokas. The couple probably had several children, but their only known son is John Tzimiskes, who overthrew and murdered his uncle in 969, ruling as senior emperor until his death in 976.

== Sources ==
- Andriollo, Lisa (2012). "Les Kourkouas (IXe-XIe siècle)". In Cheynet, Jean-Claude; Sode, Claudia (eds.). Studies in Byzantine Sigillography (in French). Vol. 11. Berlin: De Gruyter. pp. 57–88. ISBN 978-3-11-026668-9.
- Kazhdan, Alexander, ed. (1991). The Oxford Dictionary of Byzantium. Oxford and New York: Oxford University Press. ISBN 0-19-504652-8.
- Lilie, Ralph-Johannes; Ludwig, Claudia; Pratsch, Thomas; Zielke, Beate (2013). Prosopographie der mittelbyzantinischen Zeit Online. Berlin-Brandenburgische Akademie der Wissenschaften. Nach Vorarbeiten F. Winkelmanns erstellt (in German). Berlin and Boston: De Gruyter.
- Runciman, Steven (1988) [1929]. The Emperor Romanus Lecapenus and His Reign: A Study of Tenth-Century Byzantium. Cambridge: Cambridge University Press. ISBN 0-521-35722-5.
- Whittow, Mark (1996). The Making of Byzantium, 600–1025. Berkeley and Los Angeles, California: University of California Press. ISBN 978-0-520-20496-6.
