= John Kourkouas (disambiguation) =

John Kourkouas (Greek: Ἰωάννης Κουρκούας, romanized: Ioannes Kourkouas) may refer to:

- John Kourkouas (9th century), 9th-century Byzantine general
- John Kourkouas, 10th-century Byzantine commander-in-chief, grandson of the previous
- John Kourkouas (died 971), 10th-century Byzantine general, grandson of the previous
- John Kourkouas (catepan), 11th-century Byzantine governor of Italy
