= Romanos Kourkouas =

10th-century Byzantine general

- Relatives: John Kourkouas, Theophilos Kourkouas, John Tzimiskes
- Military career
- Allegiance: Byzantine Empire
- Rank: strategos of several themes, Domestic of the Schools

Romanos Kourkouas (Greek: Ῥωμανός Κουρκούας) was a Byzantine aristocrat and senior military leader in the mid-10th century.

== Biography ==
Romanos was a scion of the Kourkouas family, a clan of Armenian origin that had established itself as one of the chief families among the Anatolian military aristocracy by the early 10th century.

He was the son, and along with his sister Euphrosyne, the only known child of the great general John Kourkouas, who held the post of Domestic of the Schools (commander-in-chief of the Byzantine army) for 22 years and led the Byzantine armies against the Muslim border emirates in the period 926–944. As an infant, he was reportedly saved from a heavy fever by the intervention of the Virgin Mary, at the Church of Pege, and as a result he served in the church as a depotatos (a junior aide) until his coming of age.

Like most male members of his family, Romanos pursued a military career, about which little is known. The Byzantine historians Theophanes Continuatus and John Skylitzes merely mention that he held command in the East against the Muslims, conquered many fortresses, was named patrikios and governed several themes. On the basis of sigillographic evidence, he may likely have served as military governor (strategos) of the theme of Mesopotamia, a post which was also held by his uncle Theophilos Kourkouas and his nephew John Tzimiskes.

By the time of the death of Emperor Romanos II in 963, he was already a magistros and stratelates of the East. The emperor's death caused a power vacuum, in which the Domestic of the Schools, Nikephoros Phokas, vied with the powerful chief minister Joseph Bringas for the governance of the state. Bringas attempted to gain the support of Romanos and Tzimiskes against Phokas, promising them the Domesticates of the West and East respectively. Instead of turning against Phokas, however, the two informed Phokas of the offer and led the troops to acclaim him emperor instead. As a reward, it appears that Phokas appointed him to the office promised by Bringas, as a seal belonging to "Romanos, magistros and Domestic of the Schools" and dating to Phokas's reign has been found.

Romanos had one known son, also named John, who also became a senior general and fell in the Siege of Dorostolon in 971 against the Rus'.

== Sources ==
- Andriollo, Lisa (2012). "Les Kourkouas (IXe-XIe siècle)". In Cheynet, Jean-Claude; Sode, Claudia (eds.). Studies in Byzantine Sigillography (in French). Vol. 11. Berlin: De Gruyter. pp. 57–88. ISBN 978-3-11-026668-9.
- Guilland, Rodolphe (1967). Recherches sur les institutions byzantines, Tome II (in French). Berlin: Akademie-Verlag.
- Kazhdan, Alexander (1991). "Kourkouas". In Kazhdan, Alexander (ed.). The Oxford Dictionary of Byzantium. Oxford and New York: Oxford University Press. pp. 1156–1157. ISBN 0-19-504652-8.
- Whittow, Mark (1996). The Making of Byzantium, 600–1025. Berkeley and Los Angeles, California: University of California Press. ISBN 978-0-520-20496-6.
