= Battle of Germanikeia (949) =

Byzantine victory over the Hamdanids

- Part of the Arab–Byzantine wars
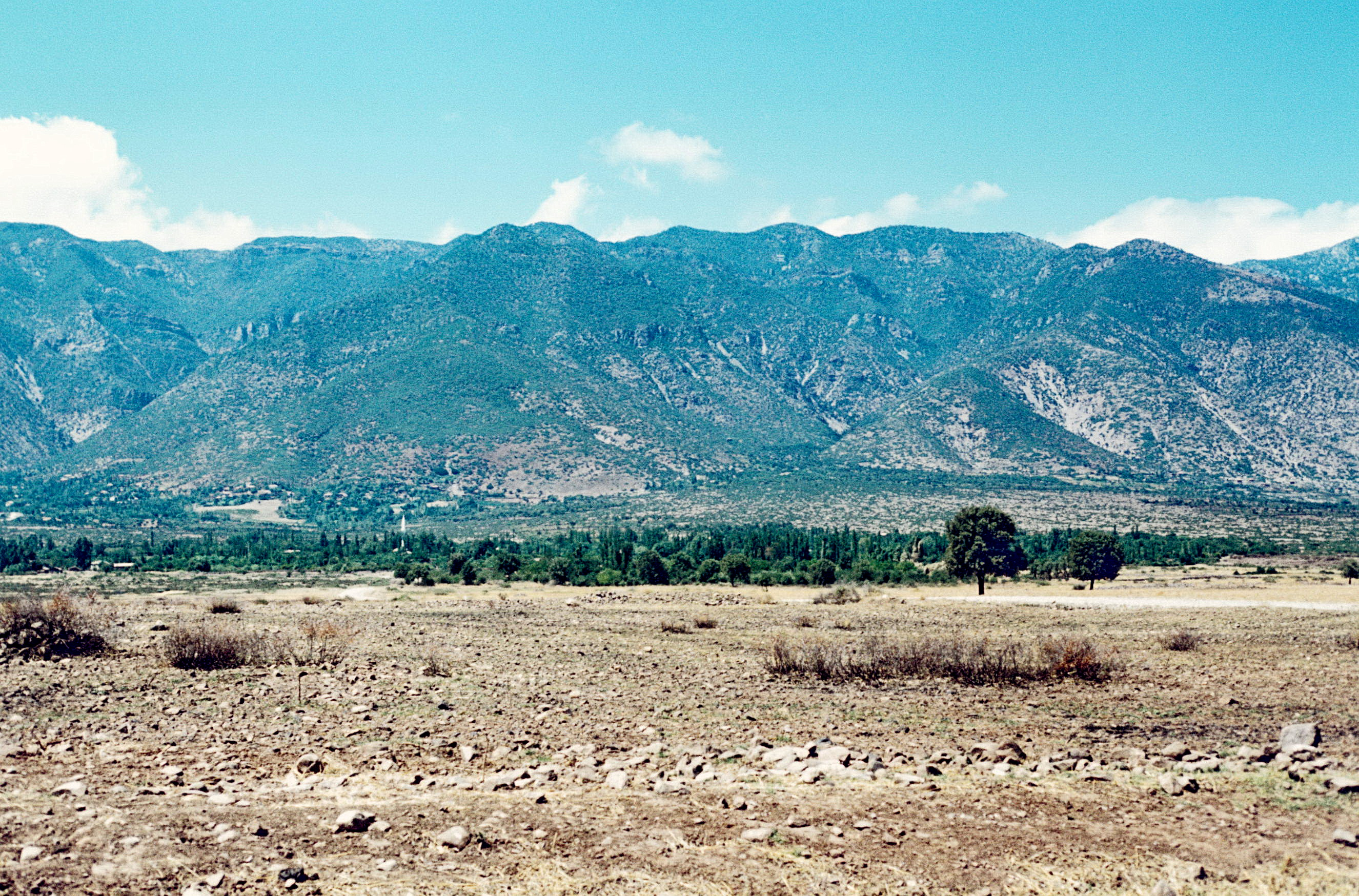
- Modern view of the terrain in Kahramanmaraş province near the site of Medieval Germanikeia
Date	Late May or Early June 949
Location	Germanikeia (modern Kahramanmaraş, Turkey)
Result	Byzantine victory

Belligerents
Byzantine Empire	Hamdanid Dynasty; Buyid Dynasty (Note: There had been friction between the Hamdanids and Buyids from April to May 949 due to the annexation of Mosul from Sayf ad-Dalwa's brother, Nasir, by the Buyid Emir Mu'izz al-Dawla. However, the two sides reached an agreement before Sayf al-Dawla came to blows with the Buyids, in which the Hamdanids renewed their tribute and became protectorates of the Buyids. The Hamdanids were provided military support by their Buyid overlords for operations against the Byzantines until the year 958, when Theophanes Continuatus notes that the Persian Buyid Emir made peace with Emperor Constantine VII following numerous defeats against the Byzantines over the prior decade. The Battle of Germanikeia was plausibly one of these engagements that involved Iranian contingents sent by the Buyids.)

Commanders and leaders
Leo Phokas the Younger	Sayf al-Dawla

Strength
26,000	More than 36,000 (Note: Figure given for large Hamdanid armies of the mid 10th century provided by the military manual De velitatione bellica.)

Casualties and losses
Unknown	Heavy

The Battle of Germanikeia or Battle of Marash occurred in the year 949 as part of a Byzantine offensive against the Hamdanid Emirate of Aleppo. An invading column under the command of Leo Phokas the Younger advanced to the city of Germanikeia and placed it under siege. The emir of Aleppo, Sayf al-Dawla, mustered a relief army to defeat and repulse the Byzantines. However, the Byzantines won a resounding victory in the ensuing battle, which enabled them to capture the city. It was the first major Byzantine victory against Sayf al-Dawla on the battlefield.

== Background ==
In 948, the Byzantine Empire mounted renewed strategic pressure against the Hamdanid Emirate of Sayf al-Dawla, while the latter was preoccupied with a rebellion of Kurds under Abu Taglib al-Kurdi in the vicinity of Apamea. Although Sayf al-Dawla managed to intercept and repulse an initial Byzantine raid, later in the year the Strategos of Cappadocia Leo Phokas led his men against the strategic Hamdanid-held fortress of Hadath. The defenders dispatched a messenger to Sayf al-Dawla seeking relief, but the emir was unable to respond, as his army was besieging al-Kurdi at the fortress of Barzuyah. Consequently, the garrison of Hadath surrendered to Leo Phokas, who then had his men dismantle the fortress.

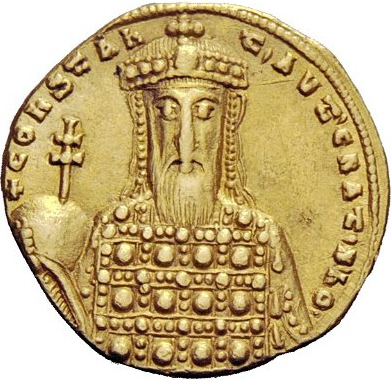
Golden solidus of Emperor Constantine VII

The success at Hadath encouraged Emperor Constantine VII to plan a highly ambitious offensive against the Muslims in 949, which would involve four separate armies conducting simultaneous invasions. One of these, under Constantine Gongyles, would attack the Emirate of Crete with the support of the Byzantine navy, while the others attacked enemies along the Al-Thughur. In the north, a division was directed against the Emirate of Qaliqala (based at Theodosiopolis), while in the south a column drawn mainly from the Anatolikon Theme, under the leadership of Leo's brother Nikephoros Phokas, would march against the Emirate of Tarsus in Cilicia. Leo Phokas himself was to lead an attack against the Hamdanids, aiming to capture Germanikeia. The strategic purpose of this three-pronged attack in the east was to deplete the resources of the border emirates and prevent them dispatching aid to the Cretan Emirate.

== Siege and battle ==
In spring 949, Leo Phokas led an invasion into Hamdanid territory directed towards Germanikeia. The route of his advance is not stated in the sources, but he may have used either of the roads to Germanikeia from Kukusos or Lykandos, or the route through the pass of Adata, where Leo's success the prior year had neutralised potential opposition. This latter route would have allowed him the possibility to evade detection on his approach to Germanikeia, while also cutting off the city from the South-East. The size of his army is also not recorded, but according to the modern historians the Byzantines would have needed a force of around 26,000 to effectively besiege the heavily fortified city, due to the length of its walls. This figure corresponds with that given in the Sylloge Tacticorum for a large combined infantry and cavalry force. Upon reaching Germanikeia, Leo invested the city with walls of circumvallation to pressure the defenders.

Whatever road Leo Phokas used to reach Germanikeia, his movements became known to Sayf al-Dawla. The emir of Aleppo mustered a large army, both with the aim of relieving Germanikeia and to defeat Leo Phokas' column in order to stem the wider Byzantine offensive in 949. As Sayf operated on Hamdanid territory and may have enjoyed military support from his Iranian Buyid overlords at this time, the size of his army likely exceeded the figure of 36,000 (24,000 infantry and 12,000 cavalry) that the contemporary military manual De velitatione bellica records for large Hamdanid armies of the era.

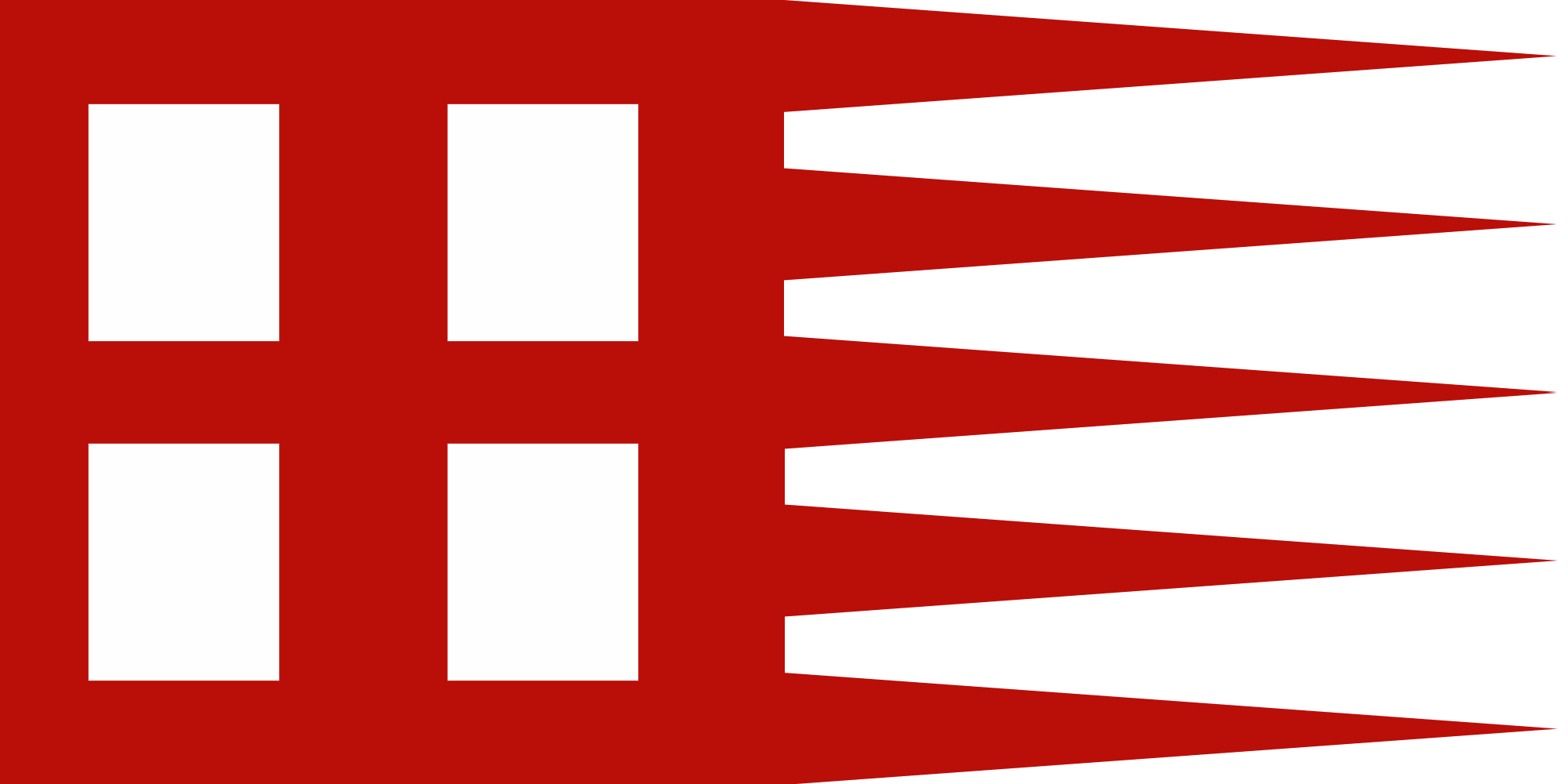
Byzantine military standard from 10th - 11th centuries

After receiving news of the approach of Sayf al-Dawla, Leo Phokas withdrew from the siegeworks at Germanikeia to better position his army to confront the Hamdanids, a course of action advised by the 10th century military manual De Castrametatione for Byzantine military commanders facing large enemy relief forces during a siege. According to Ibn al-Adim, Sayf al-Dawla promptly engaged the Byzantine army in battle. Although tactical details were not recorded in the sources, the result of the battle was complete Byzantine victory, following which Sayf al-Dawla withdrew the remnants of his army to Aleppo. The defeat of the relief army enabled Leo Phokas to resume his siege of Germanikeia and ultimately capture the city, which his army then destroyed.

== Aftermath ==
The victory at Germanikeia ensured the success of the wider Byzantine offensive against the Hamdanids in 949. Soon after the returning to Aleppo, Sayf al-Dawla was forced to depart again in an effort to relieve the city of Theodosiopolis from a siege by another Byzantine column. However, the emir either arrived too late to save the city, which fell before 27 September, or had been too weakened by the prior defeat to engage the Byzantine northern division. Leo Phokas exploited the absence of Sayf to continue his offensive towards Antioch, where he defeated another Hamdanid army in late summer. Furthermore, with the Tarsiotes cut off from their Hamdanid benefactor after Sayf al-Dawla's defeat, the Byzantine army operating in Cilicia under the probable command of Nikephoros Phokas attained additional success, defeating an Arab army and raiding the city of Tarsus. However, the victories of Byzantine armies along the Al-Thughur in 949 were partially offset by the failure of the Cretan expedition in the same year.

== Bibliography ==
- Treadgold, Warren (1997). A History of the Byzantine State and Society. Stanford, California: Stanford University Press. ISBN 978-0804779371.
- Kaldellis, Anthony (2023). The New Roman Empire: A History of Byzantium. Oxford University Press. ISBN 978-0197549322.
- Syvänne, Ilkka (2025). Nikephoros II Phokas, 912–969: The White Death of the Saracens. Pen and Sword. ISBN 978-1399005289.
- Vasiliev, A. A. (1968). Byzance et les Arabes, Tome II, 1ére partie: Les relations politiques de Byzance et des Arabes à L'époque de la dynastie macédonienne (867–959) (in French). French ed.: Henri Grégoire, Marius Canard. Brussels: Éditions de l'Institut de Philologie et d'Histoire Orientales.
- Sullivan, Denis (2018). The Rise and Fall of Nikephoros II Phokas: Five Contemporary Texts in Annotated Translations: 23 (Byzantina Australiensia, 23). Brill. ISBN 978-9004382206.
- Theotokis, Georgios; Tsurstumia, Mamuka, eds. (2025). Nikephoros II Phokas and Warfare in the 10th-Century Byzantine World. History of Warfare. Vol. 152. Brill. pp. 78–108. ISBN 9789004724716.
