= Kourkouas =

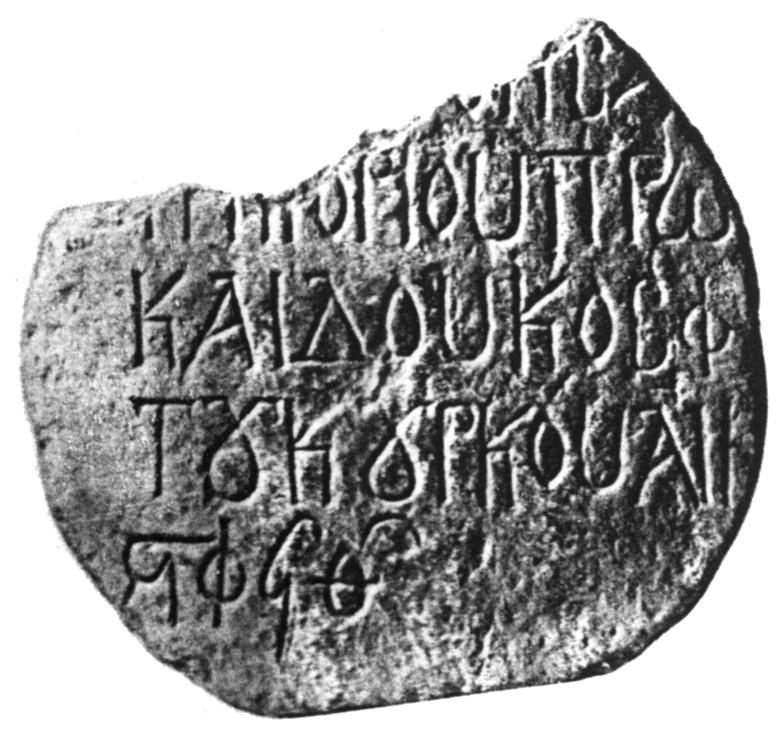
Inscription of Gregorios Kourkouas from the church in Patalenitsa, 1090/1091

The Kourkouas family or Curcuas (Medieval Greek: Κουρκούας, from Armenian: Գուրգեն, Gurgen) was, allegedly, one of the many nakharar families from Armenia that migrated to the Byzantine Empire during the period of Arab rule over Armenia (7th–9th centuries) although the latter is mostly speculative. They rose to prominence as part of the Anatolian military aristocracy in the 10th century, providing several high-ranking generals and an emperor. They intermarried extensively with the aristocratic families of Phokas and Skleros. In the 11th and 12th centuries, they shifted to the civilian bureaucracy.

== Famous members ==
- John Kourkouas (9th c.), Domestic of the Hikanatoi regiment and conspirator against Basil I

- John Kourkouas (10th c.), alongside Theophilos, grandsons of the above; Domestic of the Schools of the East and famous general under Romanos I Lekapenos

- Romanos Kourkouas, son of John Kourkouas, was Domestic of the Schools of the West

- John Kourkouas, son of Romanos, Domestic of the Schools of the East, killed in the Siege of Dorostolon

- Theophilos Kourkouas, other grandson, strategos of Chaldia and later Domestic of the Schools

- John I Tzimiskes (c. 925–976), grandson of Theophilos Kourkouas, Byzantine Emperor in 969–976; apparently died childless

Later generations

- John Kourkouas (11th c.), Catepan of Italy in 1008–1010
- Gregory Kourkouas, doux of Philippopolis in 1089–1091
- Michael II Kourkouas, Ecumenical Patriarch of Constantinople in 1143–1146.

== Sources ==
- Andriollo, Lisa (2012), "Les Kourkouas (IXe-XIe siècle)", in Cheynet, Jean-Claude; Sode, Claudia (eds.), Studies in Byzantine Sigillography (in French), vol. 11, Berlin: De Gruyter, pp. 57–88, ISBN 978-3-11-026668-9
- Cheynet, Jean-Claude (1996), Pouvoir et contestations à Byzance (963–1210) (in French), Paris: Publications de la Sorbonne, ISBN 978-2-85944-168-5
- Kazhdan, Alexander, ed. (1991), Oxford Dictionary of Byzantium, Oxford and New York: Oxford University Press, pp. 1156–1157, ISBN 978-0-19-504652-6
- Stouraitis, Ioannis (2003), "Kourkouas Family", Encyclopaedia of the Hellenic World, Asia Minor, Athens: Foundation of the Hellenic World
