= Carl Benedict Hase =

French Hellenist

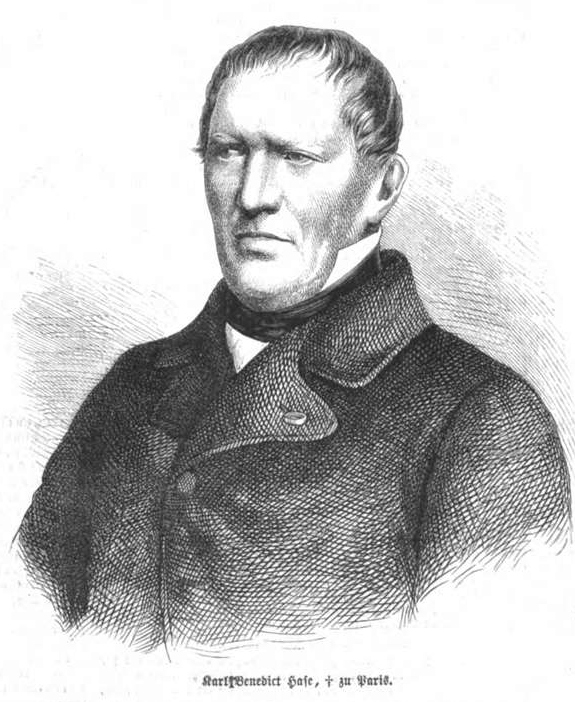
Carl Benedict Hase

Documentary on the private diary of Karl Benedikt Hase

Carl Benedict Hase (French: Charles Benoît Hase; 11 May 1780 – 21 March 1864) was a French Hellenist, of German extraction.

== Life ==
Hase was born at Sulza near Naumburg. Having studied at Jena and Helmstedt, in 1801 he made his way on foot to Paris, where he was commissioned by the comte de Choiseul-Gouffier, late ambassador to Constantinople, to edit the works of Joannes Laurentius Lydus from a manuscript given to Choiseul by Prince Mourousi.

Hase concentrated on Byzantine history and literature, on which he became the acknowledged authority. In 1805 he obtained an appointment in the manuscripts department of the royal library; in 1816 he became professor of palaeography and modern Greek at the École Royale, and in 1852 professor of comparative grammar in the university. In 1812 he was selected to superintend the studies of Louis Napoleon (afterwards Napoleon III) and his brother.

Hase died in Paris.

== Works ==
Hase's major works are the editions of Leo Diaconus, the De velitatione bellica, and other Byzantine writers (1819), and of Johannes Lydus, De ostentis (1823), a masterpiece of textual restoration, the difficulties of which were aggravated by the fact that the manuscript had for a long time been stowed away in a wine-barrel in a monastery. He also edited part of the Greek authors in the collection of the Historians of the Crusades and contributed many additions (from the fathers, medical and technical writers, scholiasts and other sources) to the new edition of Henri Estienne's Thesaurus Graecae linguae.

Hase likely forged a work later known as the Fragments of Toparcha Gothicus and passed them off as real to one of his patrons, Nikolay Rumyantsev, causing a period of confusion among Byzantine scholars over the origin of this work.

For more information, see Joseph-Daniel Guigniaut, Notice historique sur la vie et les travaux de Carl Benedict Hase (Paris, 1867); articles in Nouvelle Biographie generale and Allgemeine Deutsche Biographie; and a collection of autobiographical letters, Briefe von der Wanderung und aus Paris, edited by O Heine (1894), containing a vivid account of Hase's journey, his enthusiastic impressions of Paris and the hardships of his early life.
