= Peter the Patrician (9th century) =

Peter (Greek: Πέτρος) was a senior Byzantine military commander at the turn of the 9th century, who later became a monk and was canonized by the Church. He is venerated on July 1.

== Life ==
Peter is known only from menologies. He was the son of the patrikios Constantine, who according to the Synaxarium Constantinopolitanum held the position of strategos. Peter was born during the joint reign of Irene of Athens and her son Constantine VI (780–796).

Peter also held the rank of patrikios, and served as commander of the elite Scholai regiment during the sole reign of Irene of Athens (r. 797–802) and as commander of the Hikanatoi regiment under her successor, Nikephoros I (r. 802–811). He fought in the disastrous Battle of Pliska in 811, and was taken prisoner along with 50 other officers by the Bulgars. Peter managed to escape "miraculously" through the aid of John the Theologian, became a monk on the Bithynian Olympus, along with Joannicius the Great, with whom he lived together as his disciple for 34 years. After Joannicius' death in 846, Peter returned to Constantinople, where he built a church in the ta Evandrou quarter. He lived in a hut nearby and died eight years later, on 1 July 854. The veracity of his life after 811 has been questioned by John Wortley, who considers his monastic life a legend.

Rodolphe Guilland suggested an identity with a patrikios of the same name, mentioned in the history of Theophanes the Confessor, who participated in the overthrow of Irene in 802, and who in 809 calmed an army mutiny against Nikephoros. However, this person is stated by Theophanes to have been killed at Pliska.

== Sources ==
- Guilland, Rodolphe (1970). "Сontribution a l'histoire administrative de l'empire byzantin. Les patrices du règne de Léon III l'Isaurien (717–741) au règne de Michel II (820–827)". Byzantion (in French). XL. Brussels: 317–360.
- Kazhdan, Alexander; Talbot, Alice-Mary; Alexakis, Alexander; Efthymiadis, Stephanos; McGrath, Stamatina; Sherry, Lee Francis; Zielke, Beate, eds. (1998). Dumbarton Oaks Hagiography Database of the Eighth, Ninth and Tenth Century (PDF). Washington, DC: Dumbarton Oaks.
- Lilie, Ralph-Johannes; Ludwig, Claudia; Pratsch, Thomas; Zielke, Beate (2013). Prosopographie der mittelbyzantinischen Zeit Online. Berlin-Brandenburgische Akademie der Wissenschaften. Nach Vorarbeiten F. Winkelmanns erstellt (in German). Berlin and Boston: De Gruyter.
