= Battle of Bouqa (949) =

- Part of the Arab–Byzantine wars
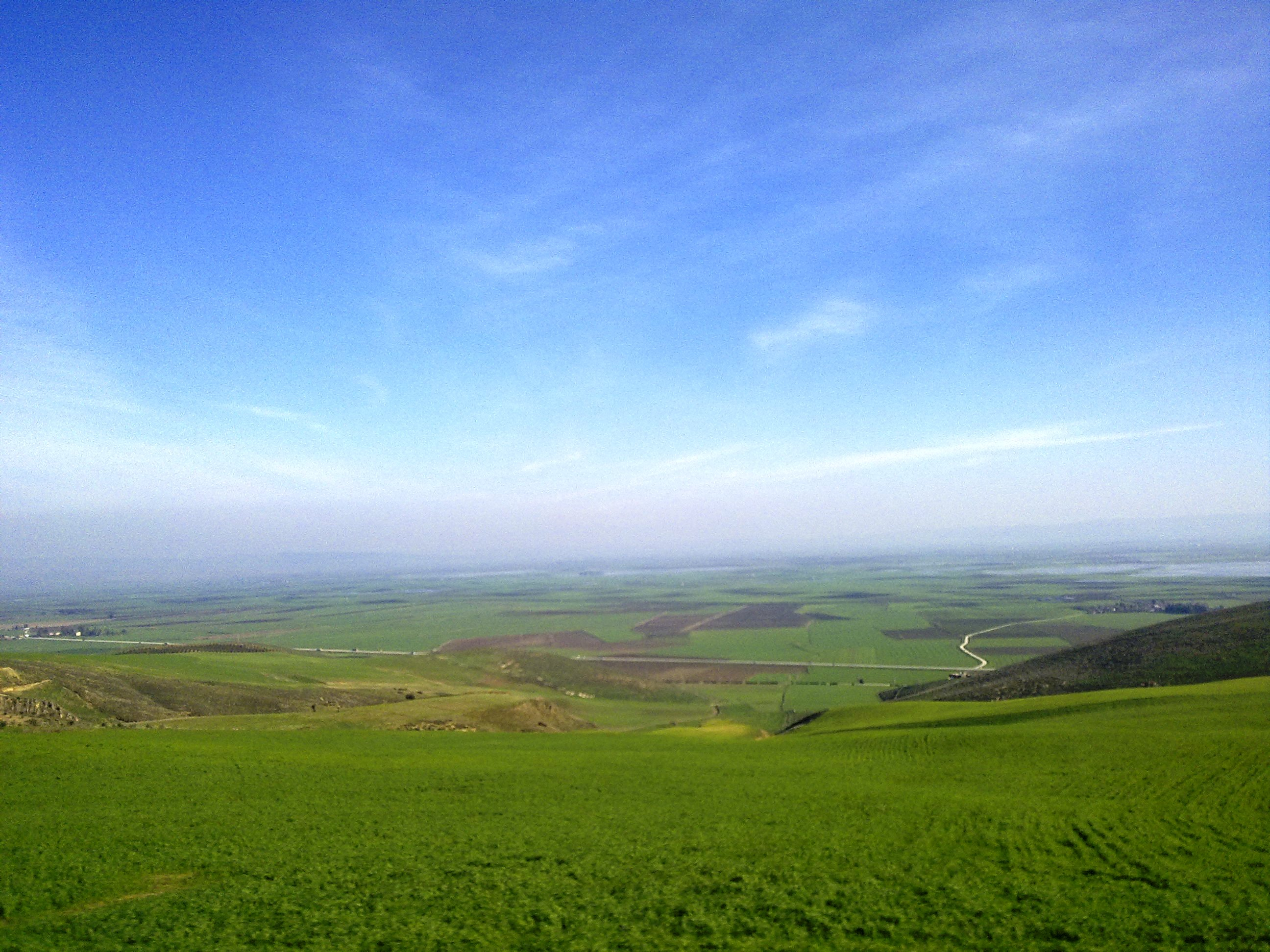
- Modern view of the terrain in the Amik Valley, near the site of medieval Bouqa
Date	Late Summer or early Autumn 949
Location	Bouqa (modern Amik Valley, Turkey)
Result	Byzantine victory

Belligerents
Byzantine Empire	Hamdanid Dynasty

Commanders and leaders
Leo Phokas the Younger	Muhammad ibn Nasir al-Dawla

Strength
26,000	Unknown

Casualties and losses
Unknown	Many

The Battle of Bouqa was fought in 949 between the Hamdanid Emirate of Aleppo and an invading Byzantine army near Antioch. The Hamdanid army, led by Muhammad ibn Nasir al-Dawla, attempted to relieve the fortress of Bouqa from the besieging Byzantines, but sustained a heavy defeat in the ensuing battle. This victory marked the culmination of Byzantine success under Strategos Leo Phokas the Younger in his campaign against the Hamdanids in 949.

== Background ==
In 949, the Byzantines launched a three-pronged invasion against Muslim territories along the Al-Thughur frontier. One of the invading columns under the command of Leo Phokas the Younger advanced towards the city of Germanikeia in Hamdanid territory and placed the city under siege. The Emir of Aleppo, Sayf ad-Dawla, mustered a large relief army in an attempt to repulse the Byzantines. However, Leo intercepted the approaching emir, and in the ensuing battle achieved a major victory. Sayf ad-Dawla's army was routed and fled towards Aleppo, allowing Leo Phokas to resume the siege of Germanikeia and conquer the city. Shortly after the returning to Aleppo, Sayf al-Dawla received news that another Byzantine column had begun a siege of the city of Theodosiopolis, centre of the Hamdanid-aligned Emirate of Qaliqala. Sayf al-Dawla was thus forced to divide his weakened army, personally leading part of it northwards to relieve Theodosiopolis. He entrusted leadership of the army left at Aleppo to his nephew and Emir of Antioch, Muhammad ibn Nasir al-Dawla.

== Battle ==
With the departure of Sayf al-Dawla, Leo Phokas and his Cappadocian troops continued their offensive into Hamdanid territory, likely in late summer. Leo's advance at this stage supported the simultaneous operations of the Byzantine army under Nikephoros Phokas in Cilicia by engaging Hamdanid forces that could otherwise have marched to the aid of the Tarsiotes. The Byzantines raided towards Antioch and entered the Amik Valley, where they initiated a siege of a fortress named Bouqa. Once again, the Hamdanids under Muhammad ibn Nasir initiated a relief effort, marching against the strategos with the army Sayf ad-Dawla had left behind and troops collected from Antioch. Muhammad engaged Leo Phokas in battle, likely at the end of summer or early autumn, but as at Germanikeia earlier in the year, the Byzantines defeated the relief army. The Hamdanids were forced to retreat after sustaining severe losses, presumably allowing the Byzantine army to capture Bouqa.

== Aftermath ==
The victory at Bouqa marked the culmination of the successful Byzantine offensives along the Al-Thughur in 949. However, despite the heavy losses sustained by the Hamdanids, Sayf ad-Dawla quickly began planning a retaliatory invasion into Byzantine territory for the following year. After attempted negotiations in spring 950 failed, the Hamdanids initiated the attack into Anatolia with an army of more than 30,000 men. Although this large-scale raid brought initial success, including a victory against a Byzantine army under Domestikos Bardas Phokas at the Lycus River, the campaign ended in disaster when the Hamdanids were ambushed while attempting to withdraw through the pass of Darb al–Kankarun.

== Bibliography ==
- Ibn al-ʿAdīm, Kamāl al-Dīn ʿUmar ibn Aḥmad (1996) [13th century]. Zubdat al-Ḥalab min Tārīkh Ḥalab (in Arabic) (1st ed.). Beirut: Dār al-Kutub al-ʿIlmiyya.
- Treadgold, Warren (1997). A History of the Byzantine State and Society. Stanford, California: Stanford University Press. ISBN 978-0804779371.
- Kaldellis, Anthony (2023). The New Roman Empire: A History of Byzantium. Oxford University Press. ISBN 978-0197549322.
- Syvänne, Ilkka (2025). Nikephoros II Phokas, 912–969: The White Death of the Saracens. Pen and Sword. ISBN 978-1399005289.
- Vasiliev, A. A. (1968). Byzance et les Arabes, Tome II, 1ére partie: Les relations politiques de Byzance et des Arabes à L'époque de la dynastie macédonienne (867–959) (in French). French ed.: Henri Grégoire, Marius Canard. Brussels: Éditions de l'Institut de Philologie et d'Histoire Orientales.
