= July 1 (Eastern Orthodox liturgics) =

Day in the Eastern Orthodox liturgical calendar

Eastern Orthodox liturgical calendar
June 30	July 1	July 2
July 1 O.S. ≍ July 14 N.S. July 1 N.S ≍ June 18 O.S.

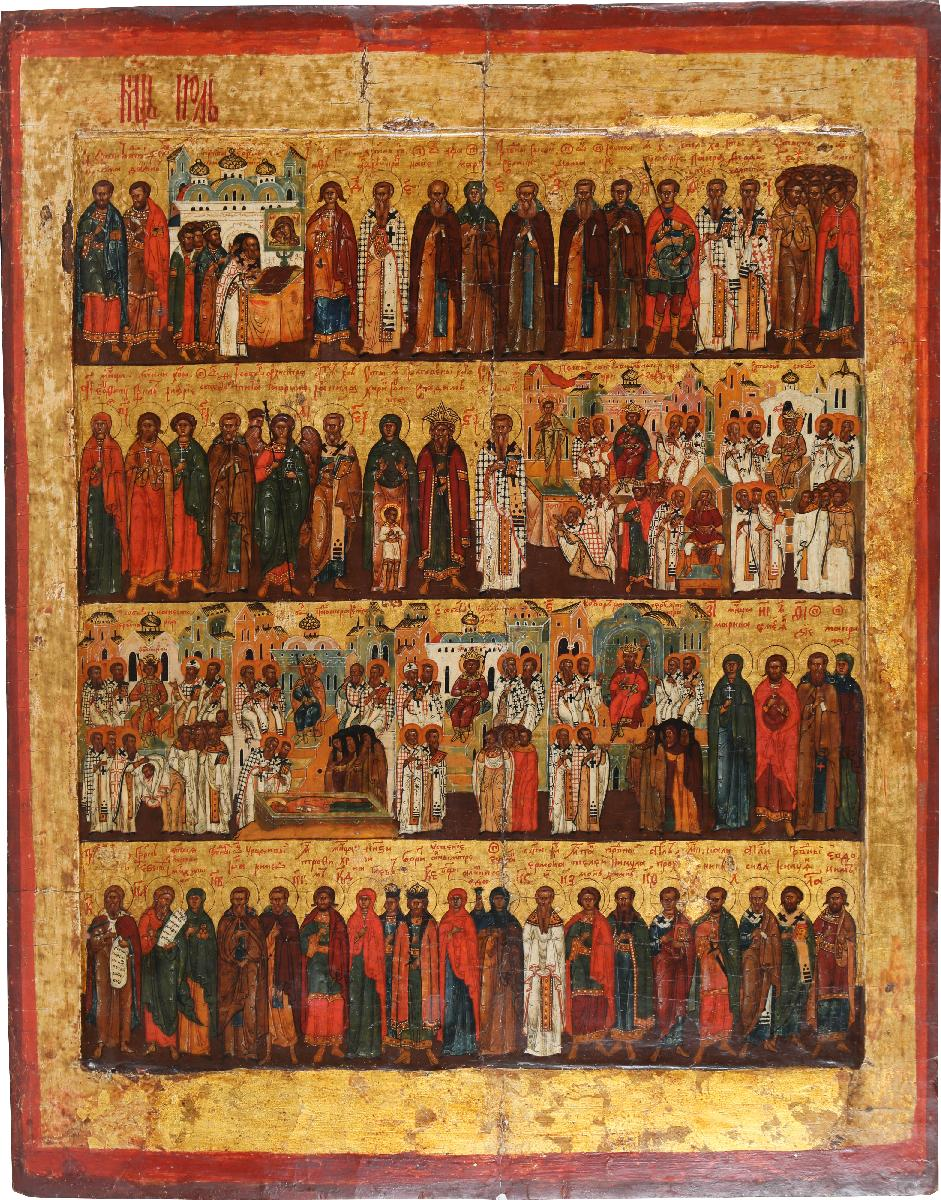
Menaion calendar icon: July. One saint - one day

July 1 in Eastern Orthodox liturgical calendars is a feast day and a day of commemoration of saints and martyrs. Although some Orthodox churches use the Revised Julian Calendar and others use the traditional Julian calendar, the fixed commemorations for their respective July 1 are broadly the same, no matter which calendar is used. (Note: Despite the dates being the same, the days to which they refer typically differ by 13 days. The notation Old Style or O.S. is sometimes used to indicate a date in the traditional Julian Calendar (the "Old Calendar"). The notation New Style or N.S. indicates a date in the Revised Julian calendar (the "New Calendar").)

== Saints ==
- Holy and Wonderworking Unmercenaries Cosmas and Damian of Rome, brothers (284) (Note: The Unmercenary Saints Cosmas and Damian of Rome should not be confused with the Unmercenary Saints Cosmas and Damian of Asia Minor (November 1), or the Unmercenary Saints Cosmas and Damian of Arabia (October 17).)
- Saint Potitus od Gargara, martyr (2nd century)
- Holy 2000 Martyrs, by the sword. (Note: "At Nicomedia, Holy 2025 Martyrs.")
- Holy 25 Martyrs in Nicomedia, by fire.
- Saint Maurice. (Note: Likely the same saint as the one commemorated on December 27.)
- Saint Shenoute, Archimandrite, Father of the Third Ecumenical Council (d. 465).
- Venerable Peter the Patrician (Peter of Constantinople), monk (854)
- Venerable Basil, founder of the Monastery of the Deep Stream, Cappadocia (10th century) (Note: The Venerable Basil came from Cappadocia, and lived at the time of Emperor Constantine Porphyrogenitus (901-959). He was the son of Leo the Philosopher and Zoe.)
- Saint Leo the Hermit, Ascetic. (Note: The Synaxarion reports that he lived in the nude due to his severe asceticism, and died peacefully.)

== Pre-Schism Western saints ==
- Saint Martin of Vienne, third Bishop of Vienne in France (c. 132) (Note: "At Vienne, St. Martin, bishop and disciple of the Apostles.")
- Martyr Potitus at Naples (161) (see also: January 13)
- Martyrs Julius and Aaron, Protomartyrs of Wales, suffered in Caerleon-on-Usk under Diocletian (304) (Note: "In England, the holy martyrs Julius and Aaron, who suffered after St. Alban, in the persecution of Diocletian. In the same country, a great number being at that time tortured in different manners and barbarously lacerated, ended their combat, and attained to the joys of the heavenly city.")
- Saints Castus and Secundinus, much venerated in the south of Italy; they were born in Sinuessa (Mondragone) near Caserta (305) (Note: "At Sinuessa, the holy martyrs Castus and Secundinus, bishops.")
- Saint Domitian (c. 337-440) (Note: Born in Rome and orphaned when young, he became a monk at Lérins in the south of France. Later he founded the monastery of Bebron, now St Rambert de Joux.) (Note: "In the diocese of Lyon, the decease of St. Domitian, abbot, who was the first to lead there an eremitical life. After having assembled in that place many servants of God, and gained great renown for virtues and miracles, he was gathered to his fathers at an advanced age.")
- Saint Theodoric (Thierry, Theodericus), Abbot of Mont d'Or near Rheims in the north of France; priest and disciple of the blessed Bishop Remigius (c. 533) (Note: "In the diocese of Rheims, St. Theodoric, priest and disciple of the blessed bishop Remigius.")
- Saint Carilefus (Calais), a companion of St Avitus, founded the monastery of Anisole in Maine in France (c. 536)
- Saint Gal I (Gallus of Clermont), Bishop of Clermont, uncle and teacher of St Gregory of Tours (c. 553)
- Saint Leonorius (Léonor, Lunaire) (c. 570) (Note: A son of Hoel, King of Brittany, but born in Wales. A disciple of St Illtud of Wales, he was ordained by St Dubricius, and crossed to Brittany in early life. Once in Brittany, he founded the monastery of Pontual, near Saint-Malo.)
- Saint Eparchius (Cybar), born in a noble family in Périgord in France, he renounced his title to become a monk at Sessac in Gaul (581) (Note: "At Angouleme, St. Eparchius, abbot.")
- Saint Serf (Servanus), the Apostle of West Fife in East Scotland, who reposed and was buried in Culross (c. 583)
- Saint Veep ((Veepus, Veepy, Wimp, Wennapa), patron saint of St Veep in Cornwall (6th century)
- Saint Cewydd, a saint of Anglesey in Wales and at Lancaut in Gloucestershire in England (6th century)
- Saint Juthwara, sister of St. Sidwell; she was of British descent and lived in Devon in England (7th century)

== Post-Schism Orthodox saints ==
- Martyr Constantine of Cyprus (Constantine of Allemagne), Wonderworker, and those with him (late 12th century) (Note: Note, another one of these 300 Allemagne Saints, who came to Cyprus from Palestine, and lived as ascetics in various parts of the island, is: "Venerable Abbacum the Ascetic of Cyprus, Wonderworker (late 12th century)", who is commemorated on December 2.)
- Venerable Leontius of Rădăuți, Bishop of Rădăuți in Moldavia (1432)
- Saint Angelina (Branković), Despotina of Serbia (16th century) (Note: St. Angelina is also commemorated on December 10 with her husband St Stephen and her son St John.)

=== New martyrs and confessors ===
- New Hieromartyr Arcadius Garyaev, priest (1918)
- New Hieromartyr Alexis Drozdov, deacon (1942)

== Other commemorations ==
- Valaam Icon of the Mother of God
- Second translation of the relics of Venerable John of Rila (946), from Veliko Tarnovo to Rila (1470)
- Repose of Fool-for-Christ Asenetha (Menshutkina) of Goritsy (1877)
- Synaxis of the Saints of Crete. ( On the first Sunday between July 1–7 )

== Icon gallery ==
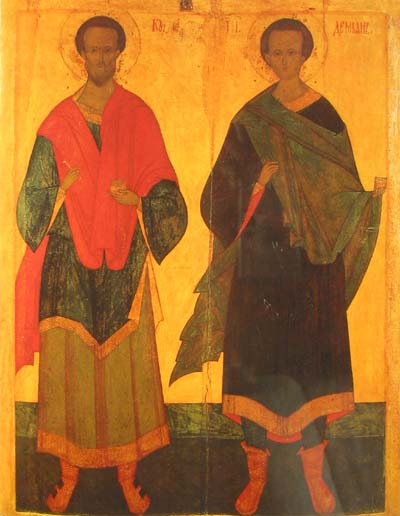
Holy Wonderworking Unmercenary Physicians Cosmas and Damian at Rome (Russian icon, 15th century).

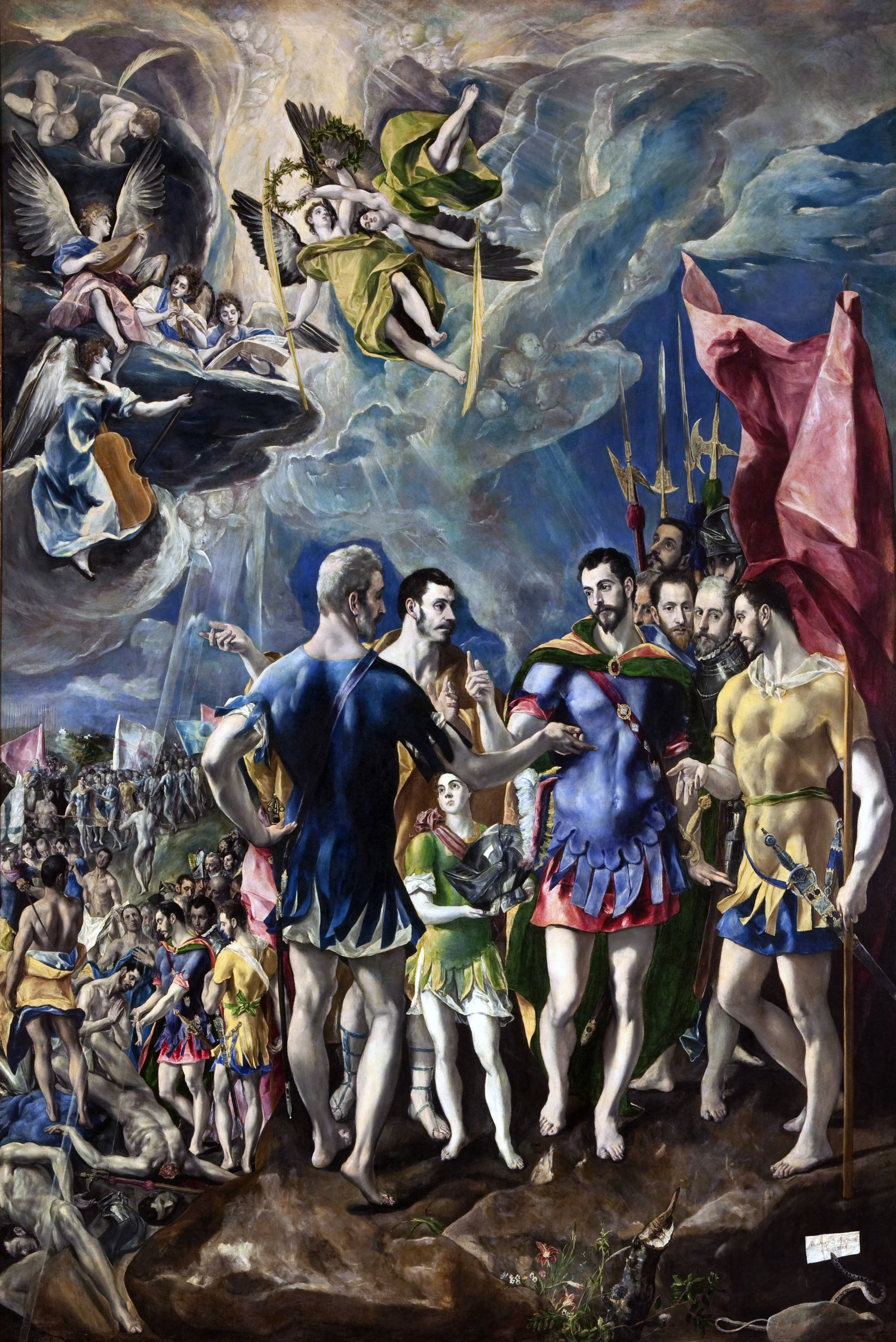
"The Martyrdom of Saint Maurice" by El Greco, 1580-82.

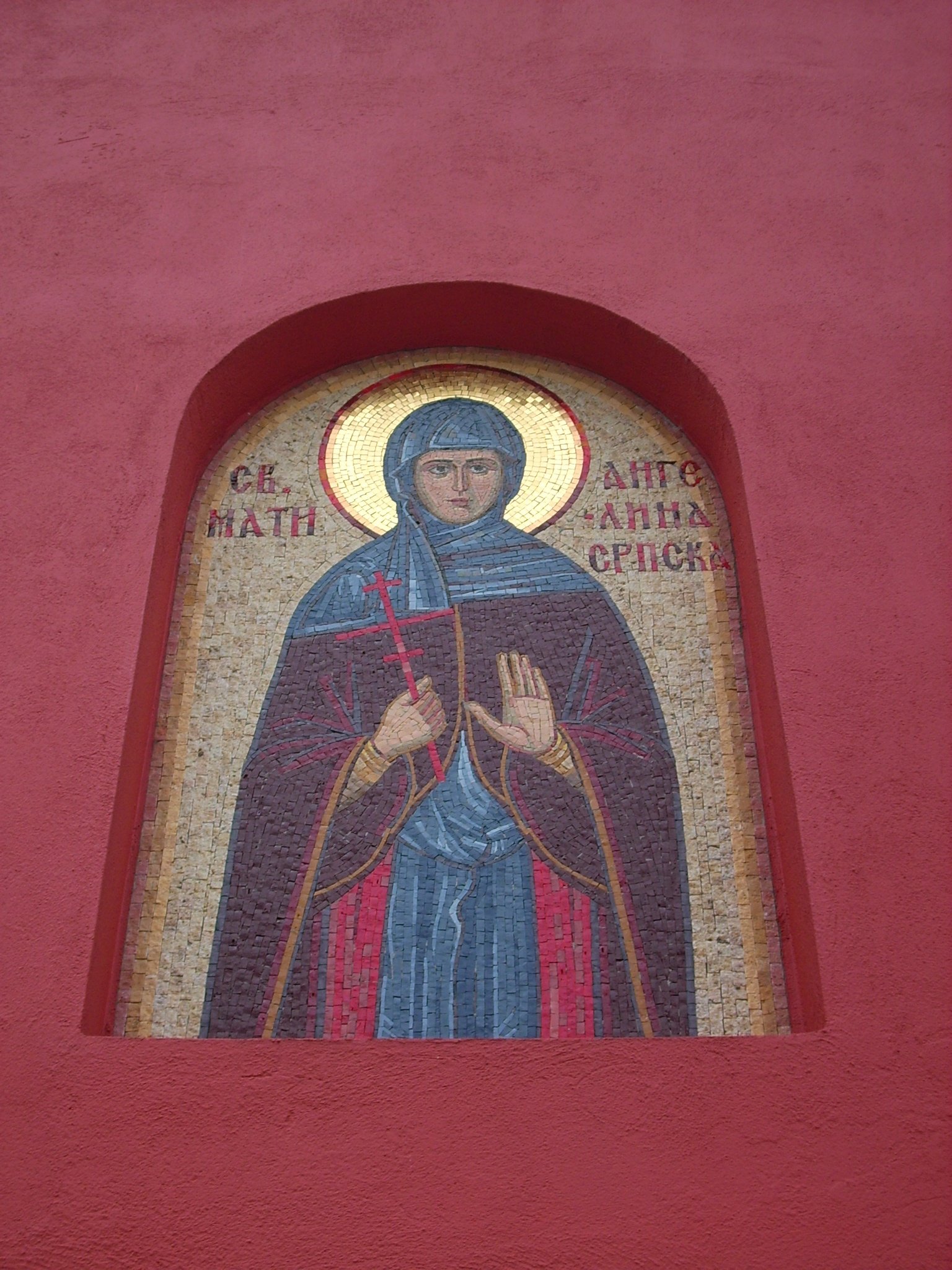
St. Angelina of Serbia, Despotina of Serbia.

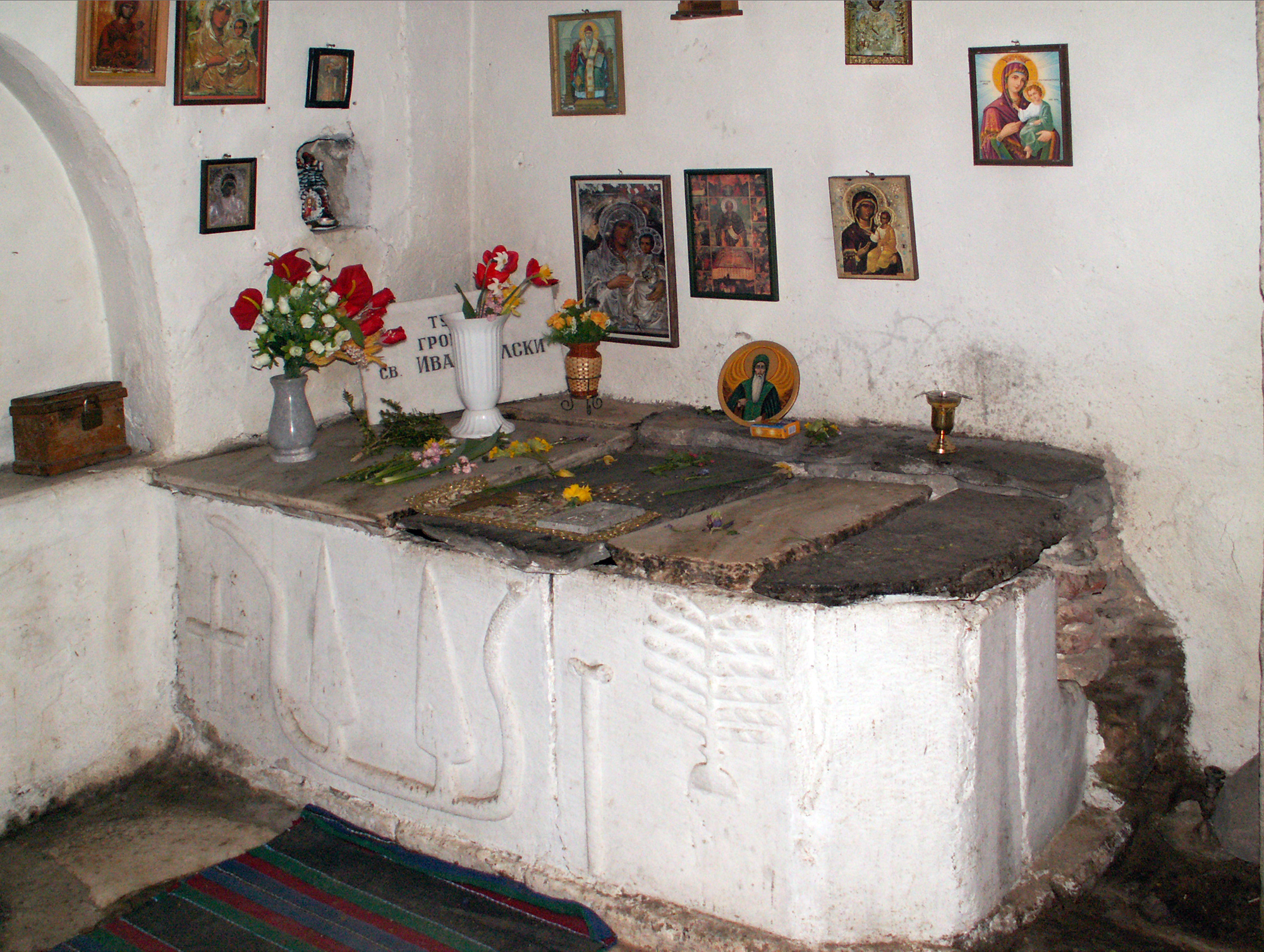
The tomb of John of Rila, near Rila Monastery.

== Sources ==
- July 1/14. Orthodox Calendar (PRAVOSLAVIE.RU).
- July 14 / July 1. HOLY TRINITY RUSSIAN ORTHODOX CHURCH (A parish of the Patriarchate of Moscow).
- July 1. OCA - The Lives of the Saints.
- July 1. Latin Saints of the Orthodox Patriarchate of Rome.
- The Roman Martyrology. Transl. by the Archbishop of Baltimore. Last Edition, According to the Copy Printed at Rome in 1914. Revised Edition, with the Imprimatur of His Eminence Cardinal Gibbons. Baltimore: John Murphy Company, 1916. pp. 191–192.
- Rev. Richard Stanton. A Menology of England and Wales, or, Brief Memorials of the Ancient British and English Saints Arranged According to the Calendar, Together with the Martyrs of the 16th and 17th Centuries. London: Burns & Oates, 1892. pp. 297–302.

Greek Sources

- Great Synaxaristes: (in Greek) 1 ΙΟΥΛΙΟΥ. ΜΕΓΑΣ ΣΥΝΑΞΑΡΙΣΤΗΣ.
- (in Greek) Συναξαριστής. 1 Ιουλίου. ECCLESIA.GR. (H ΕΚΚΛΗΣΙΑ ΤΗΣ ΕΛΛΑΔΟΣ).

Russian Sources

- (in Russian) 14 июля (1 июля). Православная Энциклопедия под редакцией Патриарха Московского и всея Руси Кирилла (электронная версия). (Orthodox Encyclopedia - Pravenc.ru).
- (in Russian) 1 июля (ст.ст.) 14 июля 2013 (нов. ст.). Русская Православная Церковь Отдел внешних церковных связей. (DECR).
