= John Kourkouas (died 971) =

John Kourkouas (Greek: Ἰωάννης Κουρκούας, romanized: Ioannes Kourkouas) was a senior Byzantine military commander in 970–971.

== Biography ==
John was a scion of the Kourkouas family, a clan of Armenian origin that had established itself as one of the chief families among the Anatolian military aristocracy by the early 10th century. His father, Romanos Kourkouas, was a senior military commander in the 960s, and the son of the great general John Kourkouas, who held the post of Domestic of the Schools (commander-in-chief of the Byzantine army) for 22 years and led the Byzantine armies against the Muslim border emirates in the period 926–944. John was also cousin of John Tzimiskes, another general who became emperor on 969–976.

John is first mentioned in 970, during the Byzantine campaigns in Bulgaria in the aftermath of the invasion by Sviaroslav of Kievan Rus'. At the time, John held the high rank of magistros, likely due to his kinship with the new emperor. The main Byzantine forces, under the veteran commander Bardas Skleros, were occupied in Anatolia with the suppression of the revolt of Bardas Phokas the Younger, so Kourkouas received command of an army sent to Arcadiopolis to confront Sviatoslav's Rus'. According to the contemporary historian Leo the Deacon, he was inexperienced, and prone to idleness and drunkenness, and thus encouraged the Rus' to persist in their raids into the Byzantine territories in Thrace.

After the suppression of Phokas' revolt, in summer 971, Tzimiskes himself set out at the head of the imperial army against the Rus'. The Byzantines laid siege to the fortress of Dorostolon on the Danube, which became the scene of several fights as the Rus' sortied to destroy the Byzantines' siege engines. During one such sortie against the positions held by Kourkouas, he was killed after he fell from his horse; judging from his richly decorated armour, the Rus' initially thought that they had killed Tzimiskes himself. Leo the Deacon claims that he had been drunk and, and just received an imperial reprimand for having pillaged churches in Bulgaria.

== Sources ==
- Andriollo, Lisa (2012), "Les Kourkouas (IXe-XIe siècle)", in Cheynet, Jean-Claude; Sode, Claudia (eds.), Studies in Byzantine Sigillography (in French), vol. 11, Berlin: De Gruyter, pp. 57–88, ISBN 978-3-11-026668-9
- Kazhdan, Alexander (1991). "Kourkouas". In Kazhdan, Alexander (ed.). The Oxford Dictionary of Byzantium. Oxford and New York: Oxford University Press. pp. 1156–1157. ISBN 0-19-504652-8.
- Lilie, Ralph-Johannes; Ludwig, Claudia; Pratsch, Thomas; Zielke, Beate (2013). Prosopographie der mittelbyzantinischen Zeit Online. Berlin-Brandenburgische Akademie der Wissenschaften. Nach Vorarbeiten F. Winkelmanns erstellt (in German). Berlin and Boston: De Gruyter.
