= Siege of Theodosiopolis (949) =

- Part of the Arab–Byzantine wars
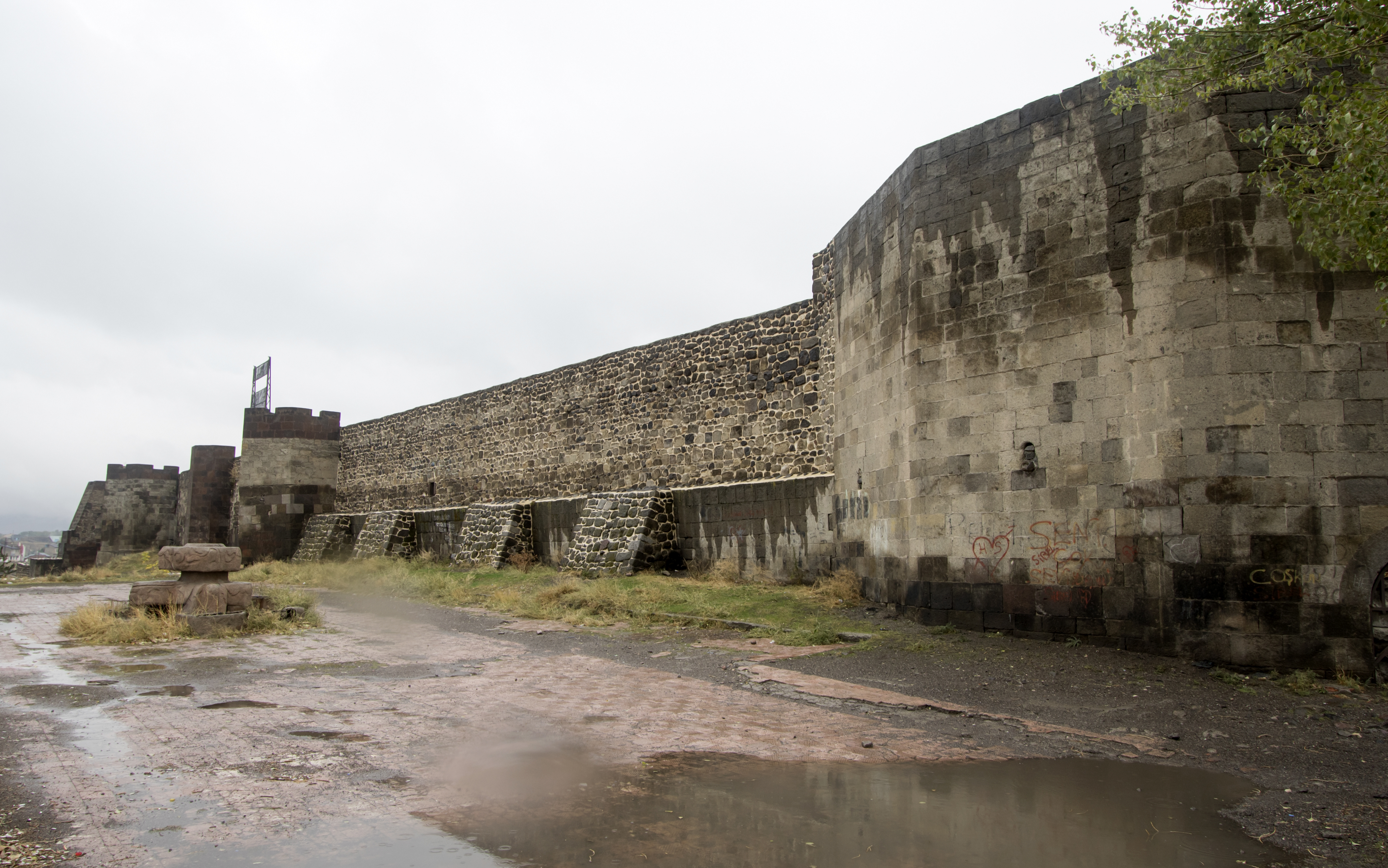
- Modern view of the fortifications at the citadel of Erzurum (medieval Theodosiopolis)
| Date | Summer - September 949 |
| Location | Theodosiopolis (modern Erzurum, Turkey) |
| Result | Byzantine victory: Fall of the Emirate of Qaliqala |
| Territorial changes | Theodosiopolis reconquered by Byzantium |

Belligerents
| Byzantine Empire | Emirate of Qaliqala; Hamdanid Dynasty |

Commanders and leaders
| Bardas Phokas the Elder; Theophilos Kourkouas | Sayf ad-Dawla |

Strength
| More than 13,000 | Unknown |

The Siege of Theodosiopolis or Siege of Qaliqala was undertaken by forces of the Byzantine Empire against the Emirate of Qaliqala in 949, during an offensive against the empire's Muslim opponents along the Al-Thughur. Although the Emir of Aleppo, Sayf al-Dawla, attempted to relieve the city, his forces failed to engage the Byzantine army. Ultimately, Theodosiopolis was conquered and occupied, bringing an end to the Emirate of Qaliqala and extending the Byzantine resurgence to Arminiya.

== Background ==
During the early to middle 10th century, Byzantine forces under the leadership of John Kourkouas and his brother Theophilos began to threaten the Muslim polities situated in the territory of Armenia, most imminently the Emirate of Qaliqala at Theodosiopolis. The city had already been sacked by Byzantine forces earlier in 902. Between 930 and 931, Theophilos Kourkouas conducted another seven-month long siege of Theodosiopolis with the support of the Iberians, which resulted in the capture of the city. Some of the territory captured north of the Araxes by Theophilos was given to the Iberian allies, while the Emirate of Qaliqala was reduced to a vassal. However, the status of Qaliqala as a vassal fluctuated over the following years, and by 949 the emirate had reverted its allegience to the Hamdanids of Aleppo.

In 949, the Byzantines prepared a major offensive across the Al-Thughur frontier against the Hamdanid Emirate and its dependants. The strategy of Emperor Constantine VII and his cadre involved the use of three separate armies in conjunction, with one force under Leo Phokas targeting Germanikeia, while another under Nikephoros Phokas attacking the Emirate of Tarsus in Cilicia. The objective of the third, northernmost column under Domestikos Bardas Phokas and Theophilos Kourkouas was the capture of Theodosiopolis, this time with the intention of permanent conquest of the city.

== Siege of Theodosiopolis ==
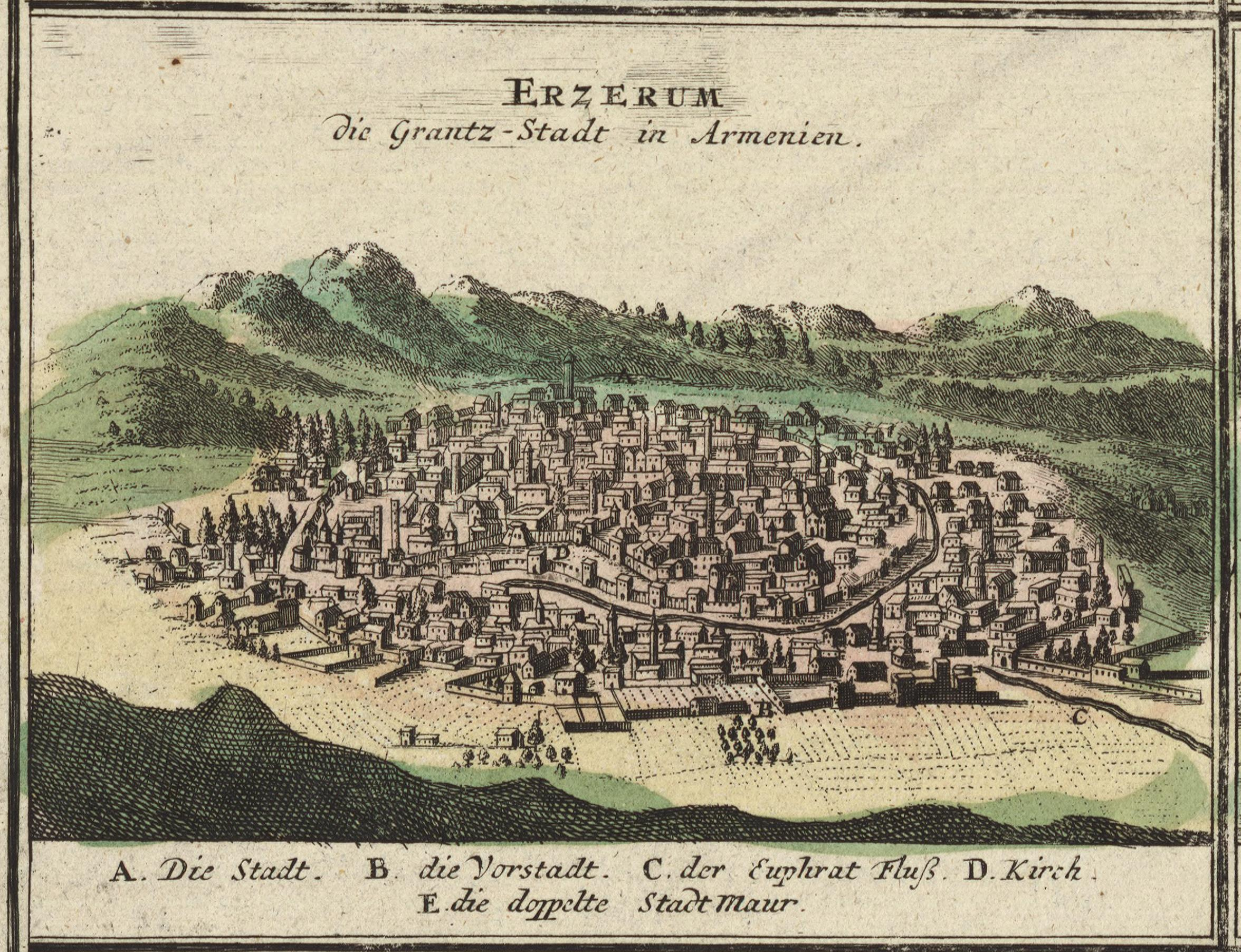
Map of the city of Erzurum, illustrated by Homannsche Erben

Some time after Leo Phokas initiated his invasion towards Germanikeia, the northern Byzantine column under Bardas Phokas and Theophilos Kourkouas began their expedition against Theodosiopolis in middle to late Summer. The city was invested by the domestikos' forces, who constructed siegeworks and bombarded the city with artillery. In order to invest a fortified location as large as Theodosiopolis in accordance with the operating procedures described in the 10th century Byzantine military manual De Castrametatione for siege warfare, which emphasized the use of siege lines, the Byzantine army would have required at least 13,000 men, with the number of men likely being higher in practice.

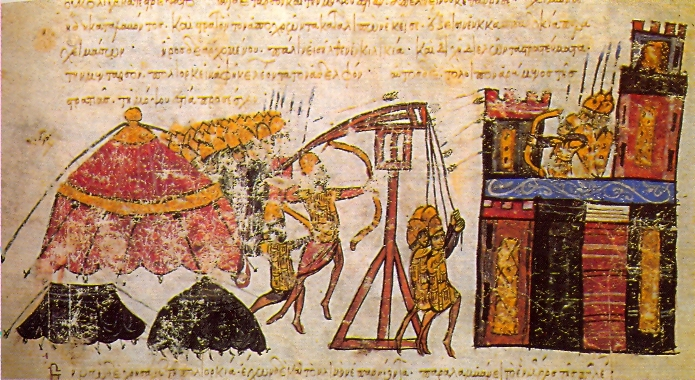
Byzantine trebuchet as depicted in John Skylitzes' illustrated text, one of the artillery pieces recommended for use by Byzantine commanders during sieges in the De Castrametatione

While the siege progressed, news of the Byzantine invasion of Qaliqala reached Sayf al-Dawla. Despite his recent defeat against Leo Phokas near Germanikeia, Sayf quickly departed Aleppo with a relief force to repulse the Byzantines siege of Theodosiopolis, entrusting the rest of his forces to his nephew, Muhammad ibn Nasir al-Dawla. However, Sayf's attempt ultimately failed to save Theodosiopolis, as his army did not engage the Byzantine northern column. It is possible that the city had already fallen before his arrival, or that the previous defeat and forced march had sufficiently exhausted the Hamdanid army, preventing them from risking a confrontation with the army of Bardas and Theophilos. Consequently, Sayf ad-Dawla withdrew to Mayyafariqin to preserve this region from potential Byzantine incursions. Sayf's diversion to Qaliqala and Mayyafariqin was exploited by Leo Phokas, who continued his offensive to raid the vicinity of Antioch and defeated the army of Muhammad ibn Nasir which tried to oppose him. Theodosiopolis was garrisoned by the domestikos' forces following its capture, marking the annexation of the Emirate of Qaliqala by the Byzantine Empire. Following the victory, Bardas Phokas converted Qaliqala into the theme of Theodosiopolis, which provided the empire a strategic point of entry into Transcaucasia, and appointed his colleague Theophilos Kourkouas as its strategos, a post which he held until 952.

== Bibliography ==
- Treadgold, Warren (1997). A History of the Byzantine State and Society. Stanford, California: Stanford University Press. ISBN 978-0804779371.
- Kaldellis, Anthony (2023). The New Roman Empire: A History of Byzantium. Oxford University Press. ISBN 978-0197549322.
- Syvänne, Ilkka (2025). Nikephoros II Phokas, 912–969: The White Death of the Saracens. Pen and Sword. ISBN 978-1399005289.
- Lilie, Ralph-Johannes; Ludwig, Claudia; Pratsch, Thomas; Zielke, Beate (2013). Prosopographie der mittelbyzantinischen Zeit Online. Berlin-Brandenburgische Akademie der Wissenschaften. Nach Vorarbeiten F. Winkelmanns erstellt (in German). Berlin and Boston: De Gruyter.
- Vasiliev, A. A. (1968). Byzance et les Arabes, Tome II, 1ére partie: Les relations politiques de Byzance et des Arabes à L'époque de la dynastie macédonienne (867–959) (in French). French ed.: Henri Grégoire, Marius Canard. Brussels: Éditions de l'Institut de Philologie et d'Histoire Orientales.
- Runciman, Steven (1988) [1929]. The Emperor Romanus Lecapenus and His Reign: A Study of Tenth-Century Byzantium. Cambridge, United Kingdom: Cambridge University Press. ISBN 0-521-35722-5.
