= De velitatione bellica =

Latin title

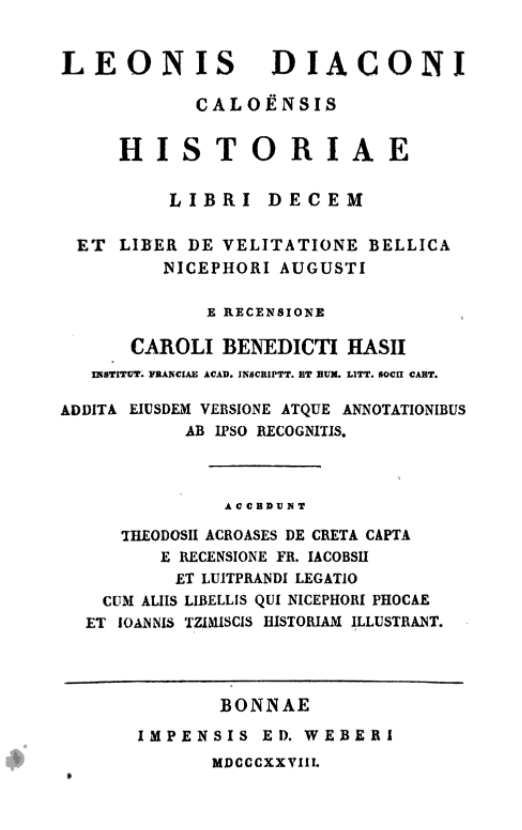
Front cover of the 1828 edition of Carl Benedict Hase (published together with a history of Leo the Deacon)

De velitatione bellica is the conventional Latin title for the Byzantine military treatise on skirmishing and guerrilla-type border warfare, composed circa 970. Its original Greek title is Περὶ Παραδρομῆς (Peri Paradromēs, "On Skirmishing"). The original author is unknown but likely to have been a high-ranking army officer close to the Phokas family. The work describes tactics used previously against Muslim opponents but the author notes that due to recent Byzantine successes they might "not find application in the eastern regions at the present time" but might be useful for future campaigns. The author is critical of the bureaucracy of the Constantinople-based government.

== Historical context ==
In the mid-7th century, the Byzantine Empire had lost most of its lands in the East to the Arab conquests. Following the repulsion of two Arab sieges of Constantinople, the imperial capital, the situation was stabilized, and the border between Byzantium and the Muslim Caliphate was established along the Taurus Mountains defining the eastern edge of Asia Minor. For the next several centuries, warfare would assume the pattern of larger or smaller raids and counter-raids across this barrier. For the Arabs, these raids (razzias) were carried out as part of their religious obligation against their major infidel enemy, and assumed an almost ritualized character. The Byzantines remained generally on the defensive, organizing Asia Minor into combined civil-military provinces called themata. On the mountainous border, smaller districts, the kleisourai (singular: kleisoura meaning "defile, enclosure"), were established.

From the late 9th century, however, the fracturing of the Muslim world and the increasing strength of Byzantium caused a shift in the balance of power, as Byzantine campaigns penetrated into Cilicia, Armenia, northern Mesopotamia, and northern Syria. The last major enemy to face the Byzantines in the region was the Hamdanid Emir of Aleppo, Sayf ad-Dawla. For ten years, from 944 to 955, he conducted raids into Asia Minor, inflicting several heavy defeats on the Byzantines in the process. In the next decade, however, the situation was reversed, as the brothers Leo and Nikephoros Phokas (soon to be proclaimed emperor Nikephoros II) inflicted several defeats on his forces and proceeded to invade and occupy northern Syria in the late 960s.

== Book ==
=== Purpose and authorship ===
The De velitatione was composed as a treatise on this type of border fighting, but ironically at a time when this type of warfare became obsolete, due to Byzantine successes. The author himself was aware of that, and notes at the beginning of the work that Muslim power had been "greatly cut back", and that his instructions might "not find application in the eastern regions at the present time", but that they would be "readily available" should a need for them arise in the future. The De velitatione is thus a backward-looking work, unique among the contemporary treatises, dedicated to codifying and preserving the experience gathered during the previous centuries.

Although the work has been attributed to Nikephoros Phokas himself, the real author is unknown. He was certainly an experienced and high-ranking officer, close to the Phokas family, whose leading members he praises for their martial prowess. Since many of the events used to illustrate tactics in the De velitatione were actually carried out under Leo Phokas, George Dennis considers him as the likely author, or at least the guiding hand behind the book's composition.

=== Chapters ===
The book is divided into twenty-five chapters:

- Chapter I – Watch posts. How far they should be from one another.
- Chapter II – Watch posts on the road, and spies.
- Chapter III – Enemy movements. Occupying difficult terrain in advance.
- Chapter IV – Making unexpected attacks on the enemy. Confronting the enemy as they are returning to their own country.
- Chapter V – Controlling the water in the passes ahead of time.
- Chapter VI – Skirmishing tactics in single raids and estimating the number of men in one.
- Chapter VII – The assembling and moving of the army. Making use of merchants to go out and spy.
- Chapter VIII – Shadowing and following an army.
- Chapter IX – Movement of raiding parties and following them.
- Chapter X – When the raiding party separates itself from the troops following along behind.
- Chapter XI – Stationing the infantry on both sides in defiles.
- Chapter XII – A surprise attack by the enemy before Roman forces can be mobilized.
- Chapter XIII – Laying an ambush for the so-called mensuratores by their campsite.
- Chapter XIV – Withdrawing the cavalry from the infantry when they are marching together.
- Chapter XV – Security.
- Chapter XVI – Separating from the baggage train.
- Chapter XVII – When the enemy ride into our country with a large force. Preparing an ambush.
- Chapter XVIII – When it is necessary for the general to skirmish against the enemy from two sides.
- Chapter XIX – The condition of the army. Its armament and training.
- Chapter XX – While the enemy delay in our country our army can invade theirs.
- Chapter XXI – The siege of a fortified town.
- Chapter XXII – Separation of half or a third of the enemy army.
- Chapter XXIII – Retreat of the enemy and occupation of the mountain passes.
- Chapter XXIV – Fighting at night.
- Chapter XXV – Another method of occupying the road and making descent difficult.

=== Analysis ===
The treatise puts emphasis on good reconnaissance, the use and control of terrain features, the desirability of achieving surprise, and the avoidance of pitched battle until the Byzantine forces have mobilized and are able to choose the appropriate time and place for their attack. Various options are presented, depending on the size of the force available as well as the size and composition of the enemy forces.

The treatise is also interesting for revealing the militant Christian fervour of the times, particularly espoused by the ascetic Nikephoros Phokas, and for illustrating, especially in Chapter 19, the disdainful attitude of its author, clearly a member of the provincial military aristocracy, to the Constantinopolitan bureaucracy and its agents in the provinces.

=== Editions ===
The original Greek text is preserved in three 11th-century manuscripts, second-hand or third-hand copies of the original treatise. Two of them are in Rome, and the third, the only complete version, in the Escorial.

- The text was first published, under its present title and based on four 16th-century copies, together with the history of Leo the Deacon, by Carl Benedict Hase in Paris in 1819 and reprinted in 1828.
- A new edition, based on the 11th-century manuscripts, with an English translation, was published by George T. Dennis in 1985: Dennis, George T. (1985). Three Byzantine Military Treatises. Washington, DC: Dumbarton Oaks. pp. 137–239. ISBN 0-88402-140-8.
- A French edition was published in 1986, with a translation into French by Gilbert Dagron: Dagron, Gilbert; Mihaescu, Haralambie (1986). Le Traité sur la Guérilla (De velitatione) de l'Empereur Nicéphore Phocas (963–969). Paris, France: CNRS. ISBN 2-222-03838-3.

== See also ==
- Akritai
- Battle of Lalakaon
- Praecepta Militaria

== Sources ==
- Dennis, George T. (1985). Three Byzantine Military Treatises (Volume 9). Washington, District of Columbia: Dumbarton Oaks, Research Library and Collection. ISBN 9780884021407.
- El-Cheikh, Nadia Maria (2004). Byzantium Viewed by the Arabs. Harvard Center for Middle Eastern Studies. ISBN 0-932885-30-6.
- Kazhdan, Alexander, ed. (1991). The Oxford Dictionary of Byzantium. Oxford and New York: Oxford University Press. ISBN 0-19-504652-8.
- McMahon, Lucas (2016). "De velitatione bellica and Byzantine guerrilla warfare" (PDF). The Annual of Medieval Studies at CEU. 22: 22–33.
- Whittow, Mark (1996). The Making of Byzantium, 600–1025. Berkeley and Los Angeles, California: University of California Press. ISBN 978-0-520-20496-6.
