= Leo Phokas the Younger =

10th-century Byzantine general

Leo Phokas Kouropalates
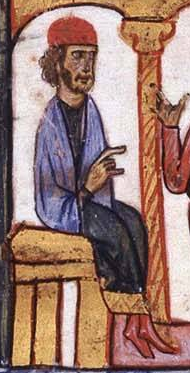
- Leo Phokas as strategos of Anatolikon c. 956, as depicted in the Madrid Skylitzes

Kouropalates
- Logothetes tou dromou 963–969
- Monarch: Nikephoros II Phokas

Magistros
- Domestic of the Schools of the West; 960–963
- Monarch: Romanos II
- Preceded by: Nikephoros Phokas as Domestic of the Schools

Patrikios
- Strategos of Anatolikon; 955–959
- Monarch: Constantine VII
- Preceded by: Nikephoros Phokas
- Succeeded by: John Tzimiskes

Strategos of Cappadocia
- In office 945–955
- Monarch: Constantine VII

Personal details
- Born: c. 915
- Died: c. 972
- Children: Bardas Phokas the Younger; Sophia Phokaina
- Parent: Bardas Phokas the Elder

Military service
- Allegiance: Byzantine Empire
- Years of service: c. 940–963
- Battles/wars: Arab–Byzantine wars; Battle of the Lycus; Battle of Germanikeia; Battle of Bouqa; Battle of Darb al–Kankarun; Battle of Andrassos

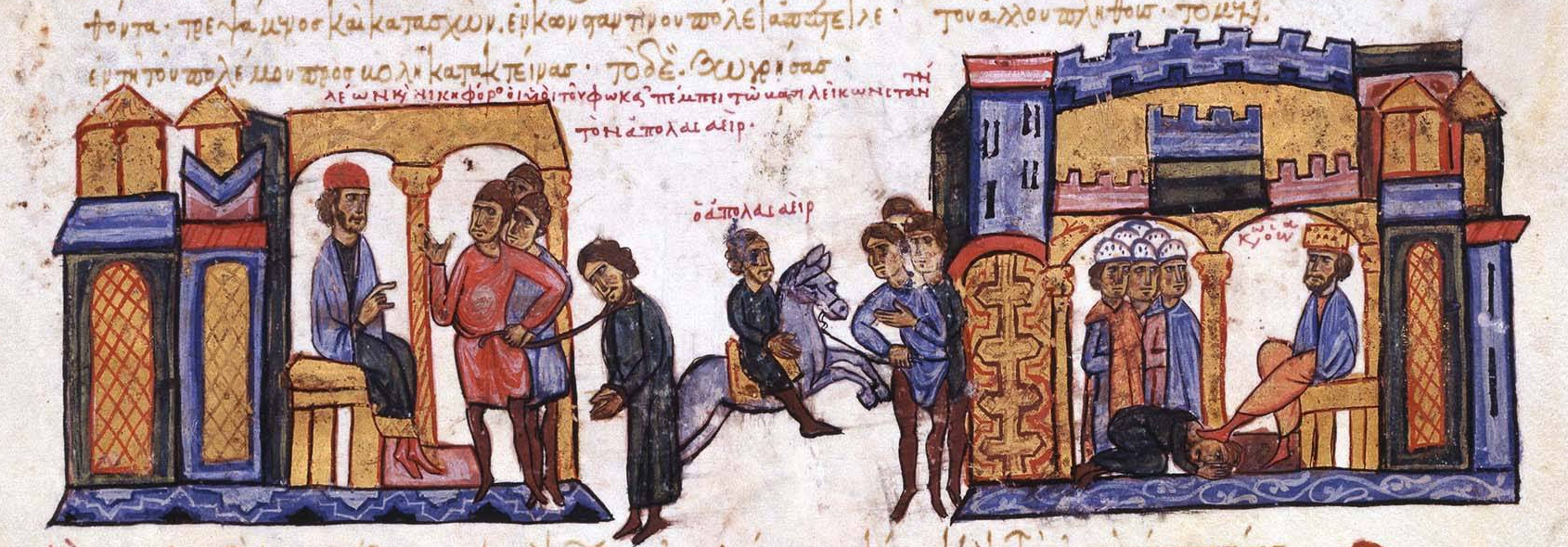
Leo Phokas (left) sends the captive Arab general Apolasaeir to Emperor Constantine VII (right), from the Madrid Skylitzes.

Leo Phokas or Phocas (Greek: Λέων Φωκᾶς, c. 915–920 – after 971) was a prominent Byzantine general who scored a number of successes in the eastern frontier in the mid-10th century alongside his older brother, the Emperor Nikephoros II Phokas. He served as chief minister during his brother's reign, but was dismissed and imprisoned by his successor, John Tzimiskes.

== Life ==
Leo was the younger son of Bardas Phokas the Elder, a noted general and longtime commander of the eastern armies under Constantine VII, and of an unnamed lady from the Maleinos clan. Leo was first appointed as strategos of the thema of Cappadocia in 945, and about ten years later, he was promoted to the post of strategos of the prestigious Anatolic Theme. Under Romanos II, he was named Domestic of the Schools of the West, i.e. commander of the western armies in the Balkans, and raised to the rank of magistros. When his older brother Nikephoros was detailed to assault the Emirate of Crete in 960, Leo replaced him as domestikos of the West, a new institution. From this position, he scored a notable victory against the Empire's old adversary, the emir of Aleppo Sayf al-Daula, whose army had invaded Byzantine Asia Minor, made good progress, and was retiring laden with booty and prisoners. Leo waylaid him in a rocky defile, and destroyed most of the Arab army, while Sayf al-Daula barely managed to flee. Due to his record of successful service in the Byzantine-Arab frontier, he has been suggested as the possible author of the treatise De velitatione bellica ("On skirmishing warfare").

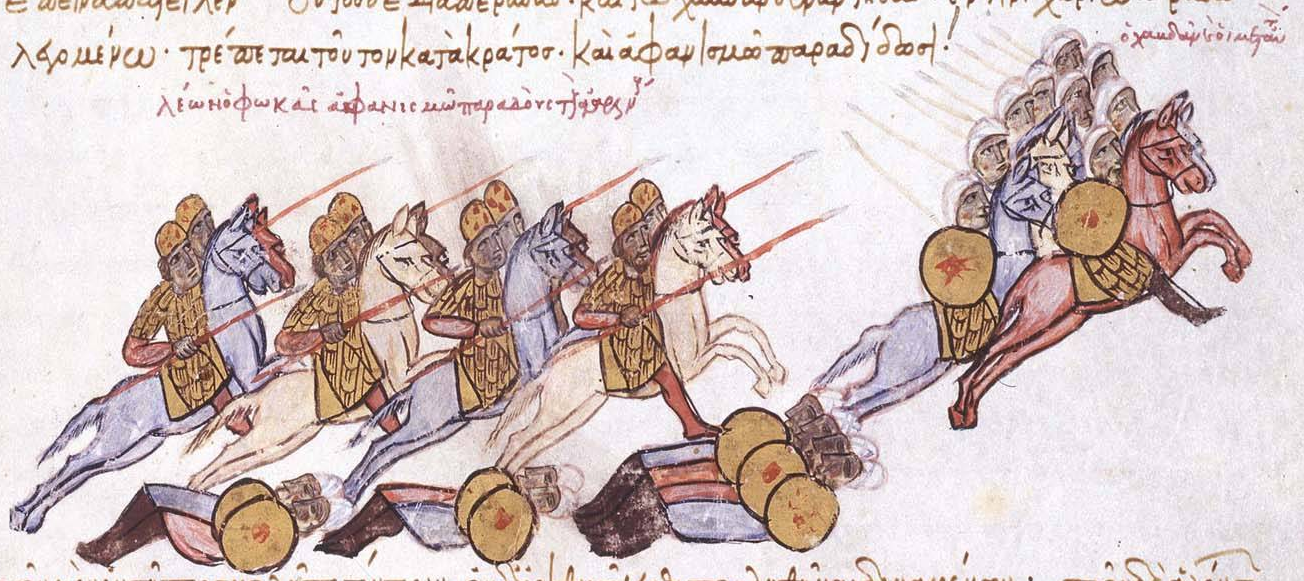
Depiction of Leo's victory at Andrassos, from the Madrid Skylitzes

When Nikephoros ascended the throne in 963, Leo was named kouropalates and assumed the post of logothetes tou dromou, remaining his brother's chief minister until the overthrow and murder of Nikephoros by Tzimiskes in 969. In 970, Leo unsuccessfully tried to rebel against Tzimiskes, and was exiled to Lesbos. After another failed attempt at rebellion in 971 however, he was banished to the island of Prote and blinded. The date of his death is unknown.

Leo was the father of Bardas Phokas the Younger and Sophia Phokaina, wife of Constantine Skleros (c. 920/bef. 930–989/991) and mother of Otto II's wife Theophanu.

== Sources ==
- Kazhdan, Alexander, ed. (1991). The Oxford Dictionary of Byzantium. Oxford and New York: Oxford University Press. p. 1667. ISBN 0-19-504652-8.
- Talbot, Alice-Mary; Sullivan, Dennis F., eds. (2005), The History of Leo the Deacon: Byzantine Military Expansion in the Tenth Century, Washington: Dumbarton Oaks, ISBN 978-0-88402-324-1
- Treadgold, Warren (1997). A History of the Byzantine State and Society. Stanford, California: Stanford University Press. ISBN 0-8047-2630-2.
