= John Kourkouas (9th century) =

John Kourkouas (Greek: Ἰωάννης Κουρκούας, romanized: Ioannes Kourkouas) was a senior Byzantine military commander who led a conspiracy against Emperor Basil I the Macedonian.

== Biography ==
John Kourkouas (or Κροκόας, Krokoas in Symeon the Logothete, George the Monk, and others) is the first known member of the Kourkouas family. The family name is Armenian, being a Hellenization of the name "Gurgen", and they hailed from Dokeia (modern Tokat) in the Armeniac Theme.

John Kourkouas was the commander (domestikos) of the elite regiment of the Hikanatoi, and led a conspiracy against Emperor Basil I the Macedonian (r. 867–886). No fewer than 66 members of the Senate and aristocracy were involved, including the commander of the imperial bodyguard, the Hetaireia, and prominent noblemen. The conspirators intended to strike on the Feast of the Annunciation, but the conspiracy was betrayed by Kourkouas' chamberlain. The emperor conducted a public trial of the conspirators in the Hippodrome of Constantinople, condemning them to beatings and forcible tonsure; the hairs left were burned. Then the emperor led the festive procession for the Feast of the Annunciation, forcing the conspirators to march behind him naked. They were then banished and their possessions confiscated.

The sources differ on the exact dating of the affair, with Theophanes Continuatus and John Skylitzes (who follows Continuatus) placing it around 877/78, but modern scholars place it in 886. Skylitzes even gives the leader of the conspiracy the name Romanos instead of John, but the other chronicles are clear in attributing these events to John. Skylitzes' account may be a confusion from the name of John's son (possibly also the name of his father).

John was the namesake grandfather of the distinguished 10th-century general John Kourkouas.

== Sources ==
- Andriollo, Lisa (2012), "Les Kourkouas (IXe-XIe siècle)", in Cheynet, Jean-Claude; Sode, Claudia (eds.), Studies in Byzantine Sigillography (in French), vol. 11, Berlin: De Gruyter, pp. 57–88, ISBN 978-3-11-026668-9
- Kazhdan, Alexander, ed. (1991). The Oxford Dictionary of Byzantium. Oxford and New York: Oxford University Press. ISBN 0-19-504652-8.
- Lilie, Ralph-Johannes; Ludwig, Claudia; Pratsch, Thomas; Zielke, Beate (2013). Prosopographie der mittelbyzantinischen Zeit Online. Berlin-Brandenburgische Akademie der Wissenschaften. Nach Vorarbeiten F. Winkelmanns erstellt (in German). Berlin and Boston: De Gruyter.
