= Hikanatoi =

- Active: 809/811–11th century (?)
- Disbanded: unknown; last attested in 949
- Country: Byzantine Empire
- Type: Guard heavy cavalry
- Garrison/HQ: Constantinople, Bithynia, Thrace

The Hikanatoi (Greek: Ἱκανάτοι, lit. 'The Able Ones'), sometimes Latinized as Hicanati, were one of the Byzantine tagmata, the elite guard units based near the imperial capital of Constantinople. Founded in the early 9th century, it survived until the late 10th century.

== History ==
The exact date of the unit's establishment is uncertain: the Vita Ignatii, a hagiographic account of the life of Patriarch Ignatius of Constantinople, records that the unit was said to have been established c. 809 by Emperor Nikephoros I (r. 802–811). A brief notice in the Chronicle of 811 fragment also records that in his ninth regnal year (which began on 1 November 810) Nikephoros I, in preparation for a campaign against the Bulgars, created a bodyguard for his son and heir Staurakios, recruiting into it the sons of the aristocracy. This date is generally accepted, although sigillographic evidence as to its establishment is vague, and could support a late 8th-century establishment. According to the Vita, Niketas, the grandson of Nikephoros and future patriarch Ignatius, was appointed as the regiment's first commander.

The name of the unit derives from the Greek word ἱκανός, "able", and the Latin ending -atus. The unit is well attested in the 9th through 10th centuries. The first battle the unit participated in was the disastrous Battle of Pliska on 26 July 811 against the Bulgars, where Emperor Nikephoros I was killed. The unit is often recorded under Basil I the Macedonian (r. 867–886), and participated in another defeat against the Bulgars, at the Battle of Acheloos in 917. In the Cretan expedition of 949, 456 soldiers of the unit from Bithynia, as well as an unspecified number of members garrisoned in the European themes of Thrace and Macedonia took part. The unit's continued existence in the 11th century can not be safely attested, as the few occurrences are either modern emendations or may refer to a family name "Hikanatos". Like most of the tagmata, it probably ceased to exist sometime in the latter half of the 11th century.

== Structure ==
According to John Haldon, the Hikanatoi were apparently modelled on the tagma of the Vigla. The regiment was headed by a domestikos (δομέστικος τῶν Ἱκανάτων, domestikos tōn Hikanatōn), usually with the court rank of prōtospatharios, although they could theoretically advance to the ranks of patrikios and anthypatos patrikios.

His chief subordinate was the topotērētēs ("lieutenant"), of spatharokandidatos or spatharios rank, while the rest of the unit's officials were below the rank of spatharios. Following the pattern of the Vigla, there were a chartoularios (financial official), a number of komētes ("counts") and their subordinate kentarchoi commanding the banda into which the unit was divided, a prōtomandatōr (head messenger), and three classes of standard-bearers: the bandophoroi, sēmeiophoroi and doukiniatores.

As with the other tagmata, the exact size of the unit and its subdivisions is a matter of debate, since it is chiefly based on Arab accounts, whose accuracy and veracity is open to question. Warren Treadgold, who accepts the Arab figures as accurate, considers the tagmata to have had a standard size of 4,000 men each, while Haldon, who considers their numbers inflated, considers a total of 4,000 for all tagmata more plausible. The lists of the Cretan expedition of 949, included in the De Ceremoniis of Emperor Constantine VII Porphyrogennetos (r. 913–959), include mention of 456 Hikanatoi, but it is unclear what part of the unit's strength they represent.

== Known commanders ==
- Niketas Rhangabe (the future Patriarch Ignatios), c. 810–811
- Peter, patrikios and previously domestikos tōn scholōn, he served domestikos tōn hikanatōn under Nikephoros I and was captured at Pliska, later became a monk and saint
- Orestes, prōtospatharios, attended the 869 Church council in Constantinople
- Nikephoros Tzourakes, prōtospatharios, mid-9th/10th century, known only from his seal
- John Kourkouas (grandfather of the namesake 10th-century general), rebelled against Basil I c. 885
- Bardas, basilikos spatharios, 9th century, known only from his seal
- Michael, basilikos prōtospatharios, 9th century, known only from his seal
- Theoktistos or Theognostos, basilikos spatharios, 9th century, known only from his seals; based on a better exemplar he may have actually been domestikos of the Optimatoi rather than of the Hikanatoi
- Pankratoukas, under Leo VI the Wise (r. 886–912)
- Olbianos Maroules, commanded the regiment at Acheloos in 917
- Constantine Barymichael, defected from Leo Phokas the Elder to Romanos Lekapenos during their rivalry for the throne in 919
- John, basilikos prōtospatharios, 9th/10th century, known only from his seal
- Leo, basilikos prōtospatharios, late 9th/early 10th century, known only from his seal
- Constantine, basilikos prōtospatharios, 10th century, known only from his seal
- Leo Sarakenopoulos, before 971
- Theodore, basilikos prōtospatharios, 10th century, known only from his seal

== Sources ==
- Birkenmeier, John W. (2002). The Development of the Komnenian Army: 1081–1180. Leiden, The Netherlands: Brill Academic Publishers. ISBN 90-04-11710-5.
- Bury, J. B.; Philotheus (1911). The Imperial Administrative System of the Ninth Century (With a Revised Text of the Kletorologion of Philotheos). London: Oxford University Press.
- Haldon, John F. (1984). Byzantine Praetorians. An Administrative, Institutional and Social Survey of the Opsikion and Tagmata, c. 580-900. Bonn: Dr. Rudolf Habelt GmbH. ISBN 3-7749-2004-4.
- Haldon, John (1999). Warfare, State and Society in the Byzantine World, 565–1204. London: UCL Press. ISBN 1-85728-495-X.
- Kazhdan, Alexander, ed. (1991). The Oxford Dictionary of Byzantium. Oxford and New York: Oxford University Press. ISBN 0-19-504652-8.
- Kühn, Hans-Joachim (1991). Die byzantinische Armee im 10. und 11. Jahrhundert: Studien zur Organisation der Tagmata (in German). Vienna: Fassbaender Verlag. ISBN 3-9005-38-23-9.
- Lilie, Ralph-Johannes; Ludwig, Claudia; Pratsch, Thomas; Zielke, Beate (2013). Prosopographie der mittelbyzantinischen Zeit Online. Berlin-Brandenburgische Akademie der Wissenschaften. Nach Vorarbeiten F. Winkelmanns erstellt (in German). Berlin and Boston: De Gruyter.
- Treadgold, Warren T. (1995). Byzantium and Its Army, 284–1081. Stanford, California: Stanford University Press. ISBN 0-8047-3163-2.
