= Mesopotamia (theme) =

Byzantine district (theme)

Theme of Mesopotamia Μεσοποταμία, θέμα Μεσοποταμίας
- Theme of the Byzantine Empire
- 899/900s–1070s
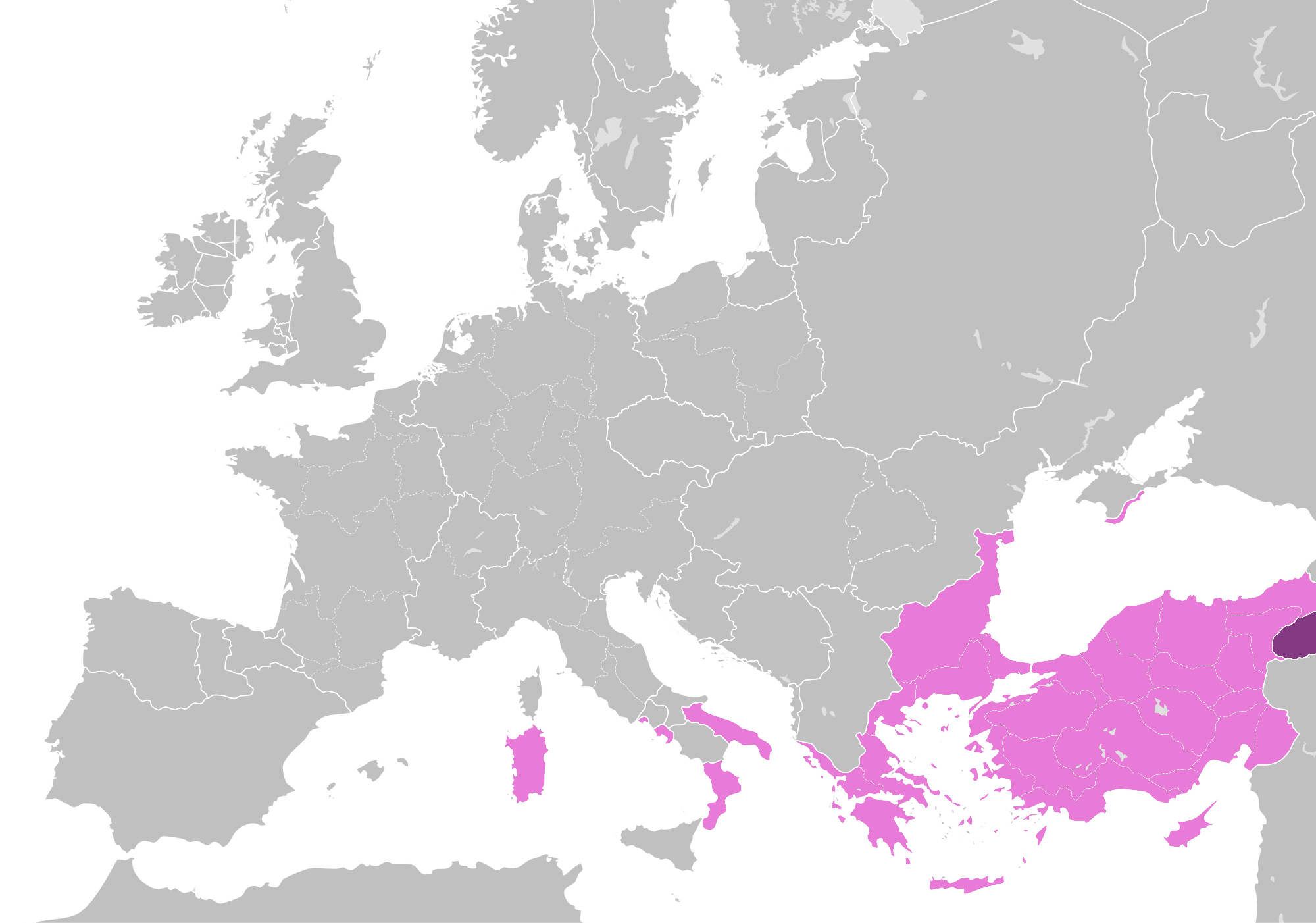
- Theme of Mesopotamia (dark purple) within the Byzantine Empire (light purple) in 1000 AD.
- Historical era: Middle Ages
  - Established: 899–911
  - Fall to the Seljuks.: 24 July 1070
- Today part of: Turkey

Mesopotamia (Greek: Μεσοποταμία) was the name of a Byzantine theme (a military-civilian province) located in what is today eastern Turkey. It should not be confused with the region of Mesopotamia or with the older Roman and early Byzantine province of Mesopotamia. The Byzantine theme was located between the rivers Arsanias (modern Murat) and Çimisgezek.

== History ==
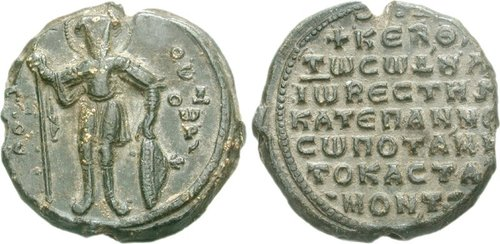
Seal of John Kastamonites, vestes and katepano of Mesopotamia

The theme was formed probably between 899 and 911, when Emperor Leo VI the Wise (r. 886–912) appointed the former strategos of the Charsianon, named Orestes, as its governor. Most of the province was formed out the Armenian principality of Taron, ruled by the chieftain Manuel Bagratuni. Manuel and his four sons were persuaded to cede their territory to the Byzantine Empire in exchange for titles and estates in other themes. The Armenian-populated districts of Keltzene (detached from the theme of Chaldia) and Kamacha (part of the theme of Koloneia) were then joined to it to form the new theme.

Although Emperor Constantine VII Porphyrogennetos (r. 913–959) mentions that before its elevation to a theme, the region was an "unnamed kleisoura", there is evidence of much earlier administrative structures than that. A seal of a "spatharios and strategos of Mesopotamia" has been dated to c. 810, perhaps indicating the existence of a first short-lived theme there, and a seal of a tourmarches with the Armenian name Mousilikes, is tentatively dated to c. 870.

It is thus possible that Mesopotamia was constituted in the late 9th century out of an Armenian principality as a division (tourma) of some neighbouring theme, with its prince receiving a Byzantine title and continuing to govern it, before it was expanded into a full theme. This may also explain the peculiar custom of its strategos drawing, until 911, his salary not from the imperial treasury but from the customs proceeds of the kommerkion of his province.

Commanders of the theme continued to be appointed throughout the 10th century, co-existing with the new post of "doux of Mesopotamia", established c. 975. Unlike the strategos, the doux was a regional commander, controlling the central sector of Byzantium's eastern frontier. In the 11th century, most of the attested doukes of Mesopotamia were Armenians, including Gregory Magistros and his son. In the aftermath of the Battle of Manzikert in 1071, Emperor Michael VII Doukas (r. 1071–1078) tried to re-establish Byzantine authority, but the province fell to the Seljuk Turks.

== Sources ==
- Charanis, Peter (1963). The Armenians in the Byzantine Empire. Lisbon: Fundação Calouste Gulbenkian Armenian Library. OCLC 17186882.
- Holmes, Catherine (2005). Basil II and the Governance of Empire (976–1025). Oxford: Oxford University Press. ISBN 978-0-19-927968-5.
- Kazhdan, Alexander, ed. (1991). The Oxford Dictionary of Byzantium. Oxford and New York: Oxford University Press. ISBN 0-19-504652-8.
- McGeer, Eric; Nesbitt, John; Oikonomides, Nicolas, eds. (2001). Catalogue of Byzantine Seals at Dumbarton Oaks and in the Fogg Museum of Art, Volume 4: The East. Vol. 4. Washington, DC: Dumbarton Oaks Research Library and Collection. ISBN 0-88402-282-X.
