= John I Tzimiskes =

Byzantine emperor from 969 to 976

- Emperor and Autocrat of the Romans
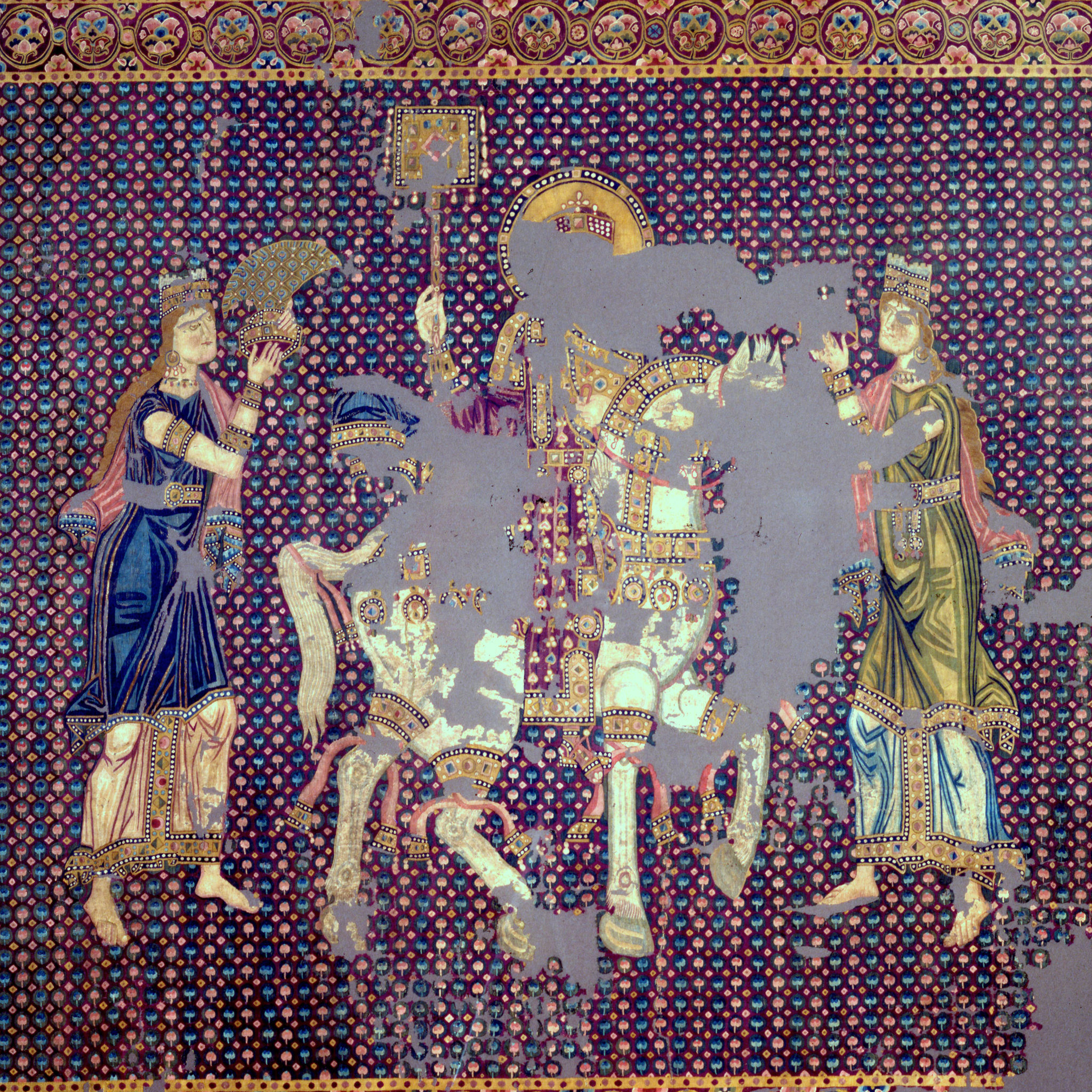
- Detail of the Gunthertuch, a Byzantine silk tapestry depicting John Tzimiskes being greeted by the Blues and Greens at a triumph

Byzantine emperor
- Reign: 11 December 969 – 10 January 976
- Coronation: 19 December 969
- Predecessor: Nikephoros II Phokas
- Successor: Basil II
- Co-emperors: See list: Basil II (969–976); Constantine VIII (969–976)
Pre-imperial positions
Domestic of the Schools of the East Magistros
In office 963 – c. 965
Monarch	Nikephoros II Phokas
Preceded by	Nikephoros Phokas
Strategos of Anatolikon
In office 959–963
Monarch	Romanos II
Preceded by	Leo Phokas the Younger
- Born: 925; Hierapolis (now Çemişgezek, Tunceli Province, Turkey)
- Died: 10 January 976 (aged 50–51); Constantinople (now Istanbul, Turkey)
- Spouse: Maria Skleraina; Theodora
- Dynasty: Macedonian

Military service
- Allegiance: Byzantine Empire
- Years of service: c. 949–969
- Battles/wars: Arab–Byzantine wars; Battle of Raban; Syrian campaigns of John Tzimiskes; Sviatoslav's invasion of Bulgaria; Siege of Dorostolon

John I Tzimiskes (Greek: Ἰωάννης ὁ Τζιμισκής, romanized: Iōánnēs ho Tzimiskēs; c. 925 – 10 January 976) was the senior Byzantine emperor from 969 to 976. An intuitive and successful general who married into the influential Skleros family, he strengthened and expanded the Byzantine Empire to include Thrace and Syria by warring with the Rus' under Sviatoslav I and the Fatimids respectively.

== Background ==
John was born in present-day Çemişgezek in Tunceli Province. His father was a scion of the Kourkouas family, a clan of Armenian origin that had established itself as one of the chief families among the Byzantine military aristocracy of Anatolia by the early 10th century. His mother belonged to the Phokas family, another Byzantine aristocratic clan from Cappadocia, probably of Greek-Armenian origin. Scholars have speculated that "Tzimiskes" was derived either from the Armenian Chmushkik (Չմշկիկ), meaning "red boot", or from an Armenian word for "short stature", as explained by Leo the Deacon. A more favorable explanation is offered by the medieval Armenian historian Matthew of Edessa, who states that Tzimiskes was from the region of Khozan, from the area called Chmushkatzag. Khozan was located in the region of Paghnatun, in the Byzantine province of Fourth Armenia (Sophene). Either way, "Tzimiskes" was a surname used by other members of John's family, as the Armenian historian Stepanos Asoghik refers to him as the "grandson of Č‘mškik".

Tzimiskes was born in 924 or 925, as Leo the Deacon states that he died aged 51, to an unnamed member of the Kourkouas family and the sister of the future Emperor Nikephoros II Phokas. Both the Kourkouai and the Phokadai were distinguished Cappadocian families, and among the most prominent of the emerging military aristocracy of Asia Minor. Several of their members had served as prominent army generals, most notably the great John Kourkouas, who conquered Melitene and much of Armenia.

Contemporary sources describe Tzimiskes as a rather short but well-built man, with reddish blonde hair and beard and blue eyes who was attractive to women. He seems to have joined the army at an early age, originally under the command of his maternal uncle Nikephoros Phokas. The latter is also considered his instructor in the art of war. Partly because of his familial connections and partly because of his personal abilities, Tzimiskes quickly rose through the ranks. He was given the political and military command of the theme of Armenia before he turned twenty-five years old.

His marriage to Maria Skleraina, daughter of Pantherios Skleros and sister of Bardas Skleros, linked him to the influential Skleros family. Little is known about her; she died before his rise to the throne, and the marriage was apparently childless. The contemporary historian Leo the Deacon remarks that she excelled in both beauty and wisdom.

== Rise to the throne ==
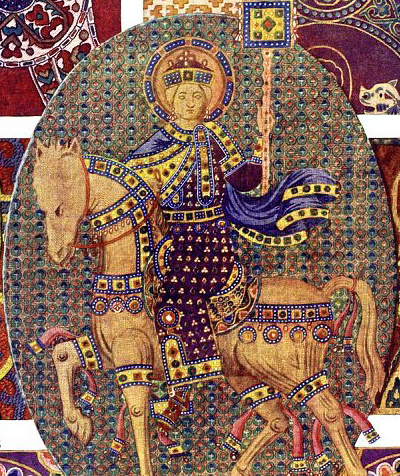
Tentative reproduction of the lost portrait of John I. He is depicted beardless, although literary sources describe him as having a reddish/blonde facial hair.

The Byzantine Empire was at war with its eastern neighbors, the various autonomous and semi-autonomous emirates emerging from the break-up of the Abbasid Caliphate. The most prominent among them was the Hamdanid Emirate of Aleppo, under Sayf al-Dawla. Armenia served as the borderland between the two Empires, and Tzimiskes successfully defended his province. He and his troops joined the main army which was campaigning under the command of Nikephoros Phokas.

By 962 the Hamdanids had sued for peace with favorable terms for the Byzantines, securing the eastern border of the Empire for some years. Tzimiskes distinguished himself during the war both at the side of his uncle and at leading parts of the army to battle under his personal command, as in the Battle of Raban in 958. He was rather popular with his troops and gained a reputation for taking the initiative during battles, turning their course.

On the death of Emperor Romanos II in 963, Tzimiskes urged his uncle to seize the throne. After helping Nikephoros to the throne and continuing to defend the Empire's eastern provinces, Tzimiskes was deprived of his command by an intrigue, for which he retaliated by conspiring with Nikephoros's wife Theophano and a number of disgruntled leading generals (Michael Bourtzes and Leo Balantes) to assassinate Nikephoros.

== Reign ==
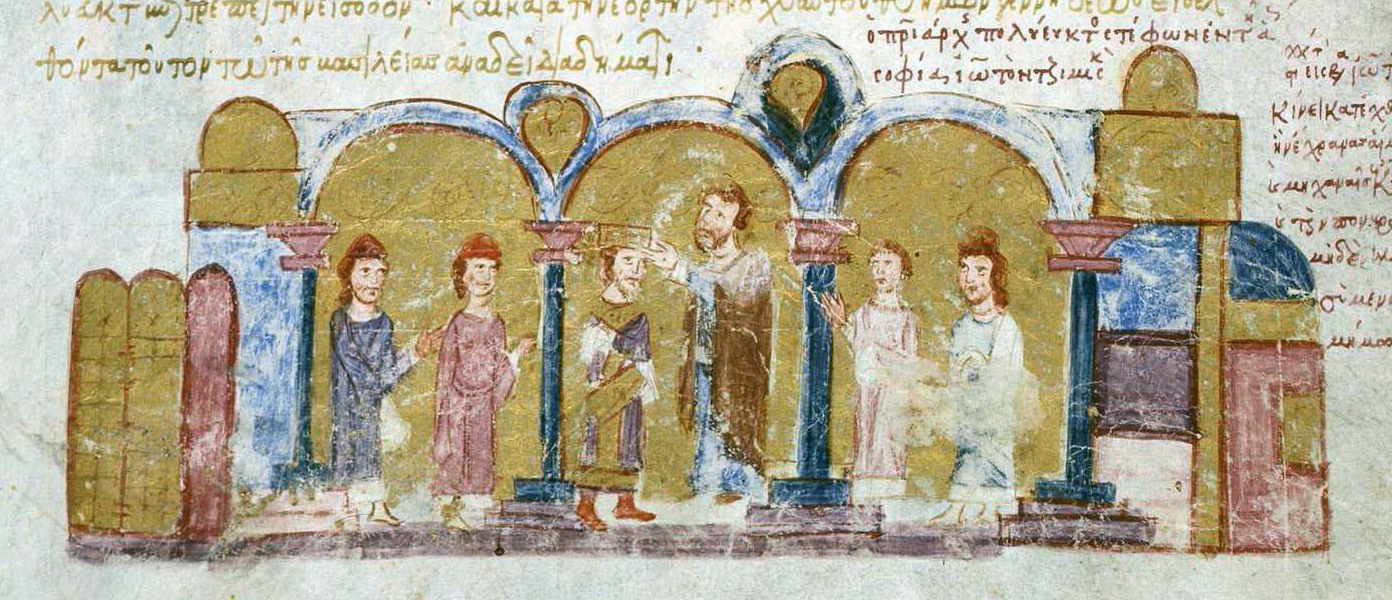
The coronation of John Tzimiskes, from the Madrid Skylitzes

After his coronation in December 969, Tzimiskes dispatched his brother-in-law Bardas Skleros to subdue a rebellion by Bardas Phokas, a cousin of Tzimiskes who aspired to succeed their uncle as emperor. To solidify his position, Tzimiskes married Theodora, a daughter of Emperor Constantine VII. He proceeded to justify his usurpation by repelling the foreign invaders of the Empire. The tributary of Aleppo was soon assured under the Treaty of Safar.

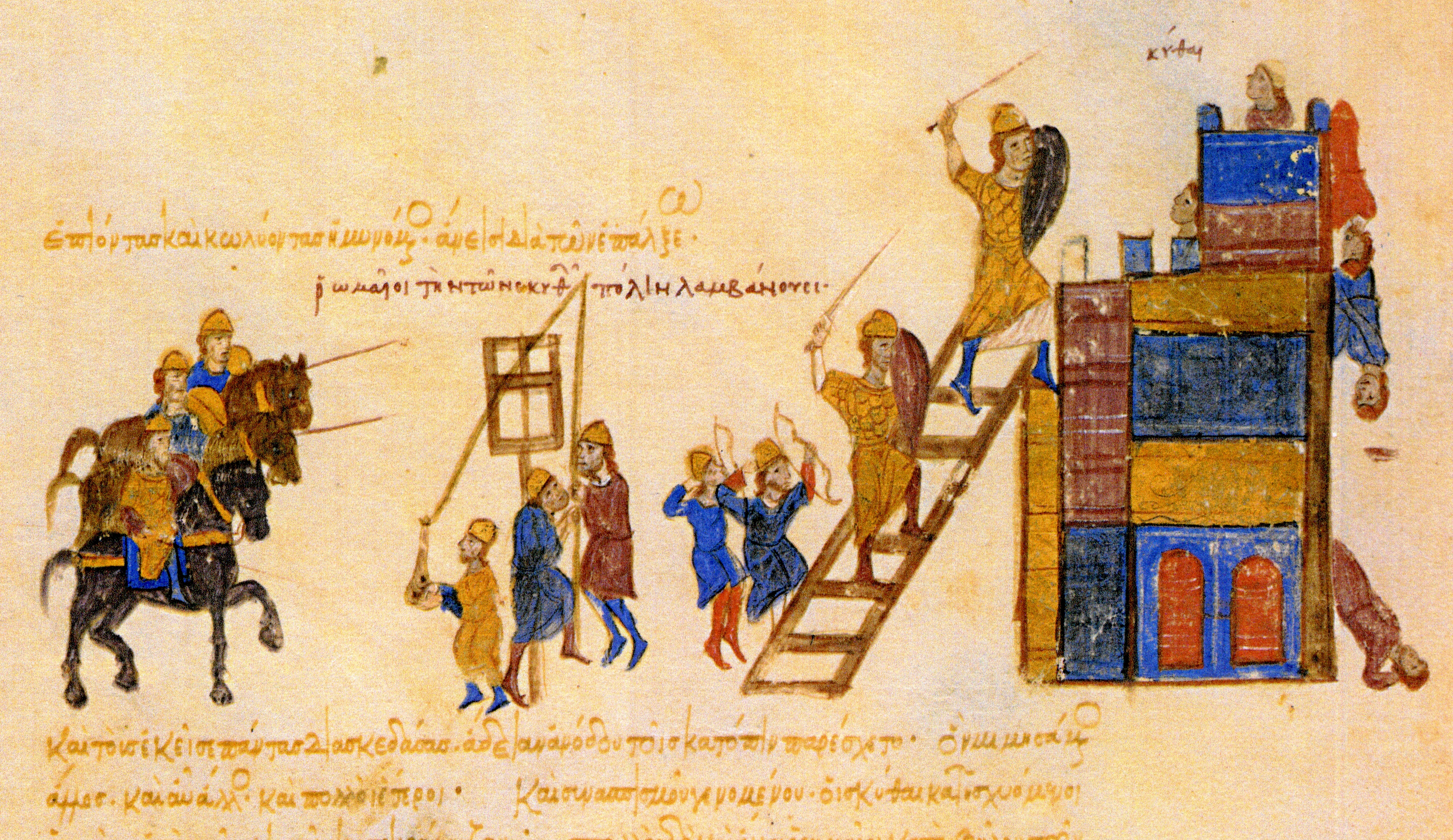
The Byzantine army under John I lays siege to the Bulgarian capital at Preslav.

During his early reign he had to fight off the Kievan Rus' encroachment on the Lower Danube. In 970 he sent his brother-in-law, Bardas Skleros, to push the Rus' forces out of Thrace; Skleros defeated the Rus' army at Arcadiopolis. In 971, John Tzimiskes took the main army across Mt. Haemus, and besieged the fortress of Dorostolon (Silistra) on the Danube for 65 days, where after several hard-fought battles he defeated Grand Prince Sviatoslav I of Kiev. Tzimiskes and Sviatoslav ended up negotiating a truce, in which weaponry, armor and provisions were exchanged for the famished Rus' departure.

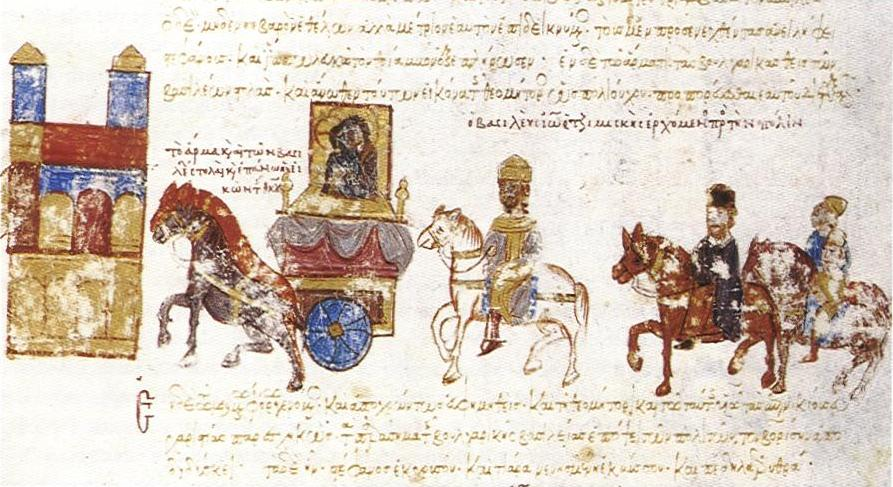
John Tzimiskes enters Constantinople in triumph along with the captured Boris II of Bulgaria.

On his return to Constantinople, Tzimiskes celebrated a triumph, expanded the Church of Christ of the Chalke as thanksgiving, divested the captive Bulgarian Emperor Boris II of the Imperial symbols, and proclaimed Bulgaria annexed. He further secured his northern frontier by transplanting to Thrace some colonies of the Paulicians, whom he suspected of sympathising with their Muslim neighbours in the east.

In 972, Tzimiskes turned against the Abbasid Empire and its vassals, beginning with an invasion of upper Mesopotamia. A second campaign, in 975, was aimed at Syria, where his forces took Emesa, Heliopolis, Damascus, Tiberias, Nazareth, Caesarea, Sidon, Beirut, Byblos, and Tripoli, but failed to take Jerusalem.

== Death ==
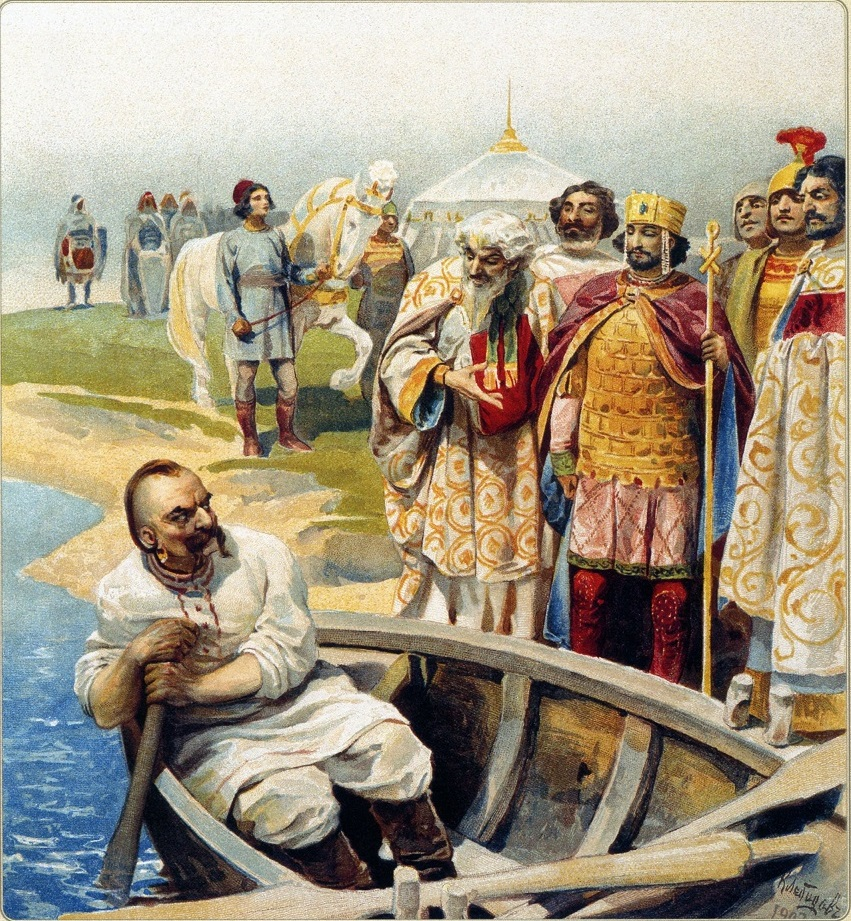
Klavdiy Lebedev (1852–1916). Svyatoslav's meeting with Emperor John, as described by Leo the Deacon

Tzimiskes died suddenly in 976 returning from his second campaign against the Abbasids and was buried in the Church of Christ Chalkites, which he had rebuilt. Several sources state that the Imperial chamberlain Basil Lekapenos poisoned the emperor to prevent him from stripping Lekapenos of his ill-gotten lands and riches. Tzimiskes left all his own personal wealth to the poor and the sick. He was succeeded by his ward and nephew, Basil II, who had been nominal co-emperor since 960. He left his successor a strengthened and expanded empire.

== Assessment ==
Finnish philologist and researcher Paavo Hohti asserts that Tzimiskes was one of "Byzantine's most capable military generals", noting his talents as a mediator and a reformer of religious institutions. According to Hohti, Tzimiskes's successful campaigns against the Rus and the Arabs allowed him to restore the ascendancy of the Eastern Roman Empire in the Balkans and Mesopotamia.

== Legacy ==
Çemişgezek in the Tunceli Province, modern day Turkey, is named after him, as he was born there. Tsimiski Street, the main commercial road in the center of Thessaloniki is named after him. His remains are now believed to be held in Mount Athos in Greece.

== See also ==
- List of Byzantine emperors

== Sources ==
- Andriollo, Lisa (2012), "Les Kourkouas (IXe-XIe siècle)", in Cheynet, Jean-Claude; Sode, Claudia (eds.), Studies in Byzantine Sigillography (in French), vol. 11, Berlin: De Gruyter, pp. 57–88, ISBN 978-3-11-026668-9
- Leo the Deacon (2005) [c. 1000]. Talbot, Alice-Mary; Sullivan, Dennis F. (eds.). The History of Leo the Deacon. Dumbarton Oaks. ISBN 978-0-88402-324-1.
- Blaum, Paul A. (1994). The Days of the Warlords: A History of the Byzantine Empire, A.D. 969-991. University Press of America. ISBN 978-0-8191-9657-6.
- Kazhdan, Alexander (1991). "Kourkouas". In Kazhdan, Alexander (ed.). The Oxford Dictionary of Byzantium. Oxford and New York: Oxford University Press. pp. 1156–1157. ISBN 0-19-504652-8.
- Lilie, Ralph-Johannes; Winkelmann, Friedhelm (1998). Prosopographie der mittelbyzantinischen Zeit (in German). De Gruyter. ISBN 978-3110151794.
- Romane, Julian (2015). Byzantium Triumphant. Pen and Sword Books. ISBN 978-1473845701.
- Treadgold, Warren (1997). A History of the Byzantine State and Society. Stanford, California: Stanford University Press. ISBN 0-8047-2630-2.
- Norwich, John J. (1992). Byzantium: The Apogee (First American ed.). New York: Alfred A. Knopf, Inc. ISBN 0394537785. OCLC 18164817.
- Shepard, Jonathan (2010). "Raban, Battle of". In Rogers, Clifford J. (ed.). The Oxford Encyclopedia of Medieval Warfare and Military Technology. Vol. 3:Merc-Zuri. Oxford University Press. pp. 151–152.
- Walker, Paul E. (1977). "The "Crusade" of John Tzimisces in the light of new Arabic evidence". Byzantion. 47: 301–327.

John I Tzimiskes Macedonian dynasty Born: c. 925 Died: 10 January 976
Regnal titles
Preceded by Nikephoros II Phokas	Byzantine emperor 969–976 (with Basil II and Constantine VIII as junior emperors)	Succeeded by Basil II
Military offices
Preceded by Nikephoros II Phokas	Domestic of the Schools of the East; 963–?	Unknown Title next held by Melias
