= Armenian Campaign of Leo Phokas the Elder (915) =

Byzantine campaigns

- Part of the Arab–Byzantine wars
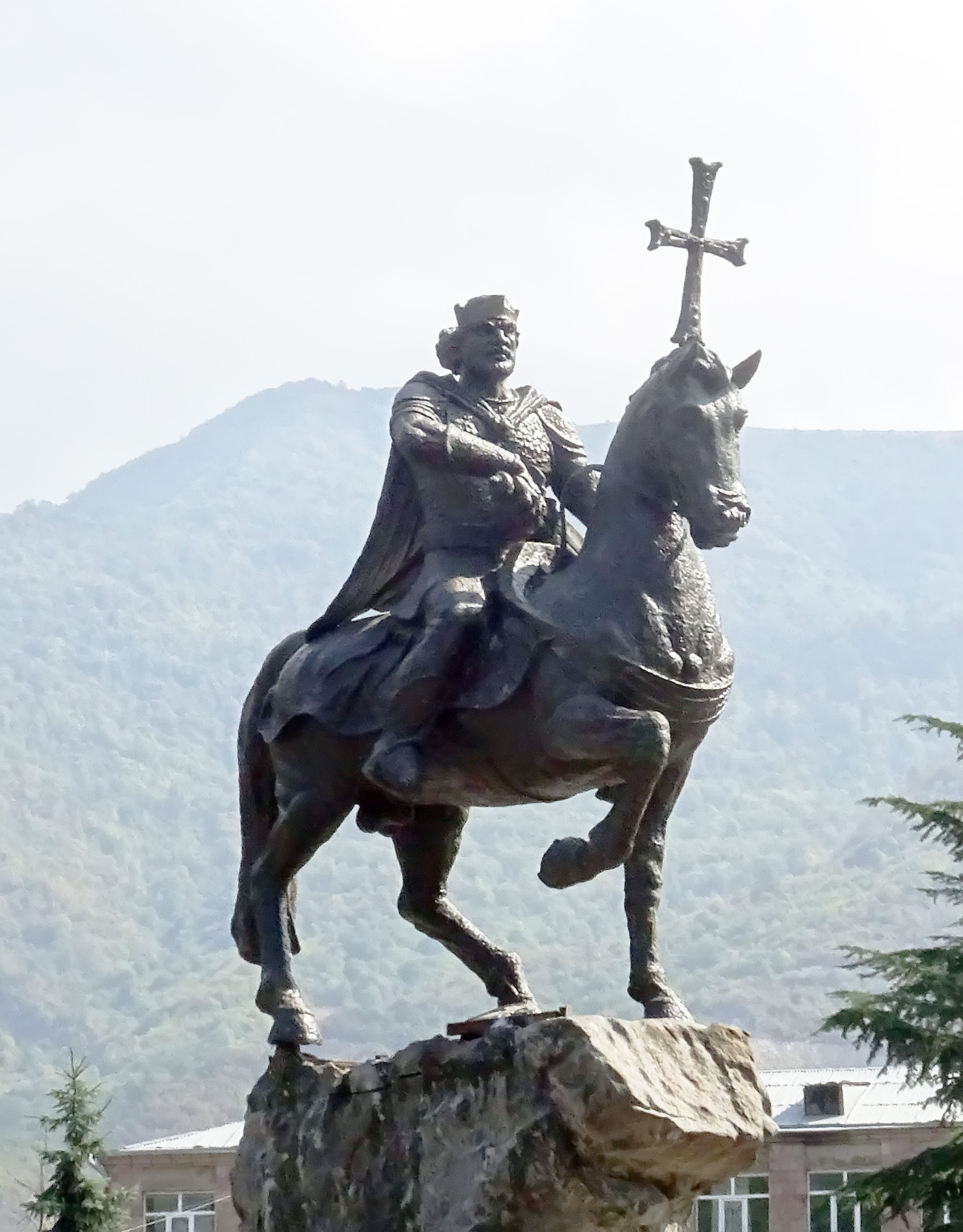
- Modern statue of Ashot II in Ijevan
Date	Summer - late Autumn 915
Location	Armenia and other locations along the Al-Thughur
Result	Decisive Byzantine–Armenian victory: Restoration of Armenian independence; Ashot II installed as king of Armenia
Territorial changes	Resumption of tribute from the Hamdanids to Byzantium

Belligerents
Byzantine Empire; Bagratid Armenia; Kingdom of Vaspurakan; Principality of Taron; Principality of Syunik Supported by: Kingdom of the Iberians	Sajid Dynasty; Emirate of Dvin; Abbasid Caliphate; Emirate of Tarsus

Commanders and leaders
Leo Phokas the Elder; Ashot II; Melias; Gagik I Artsruni; Smbat of Syunik	Sparapet Ashot

The Armenian Campaign of Leo Phokas the Elder was a joint operation by the Byzantine Empire and its Armenian allies, conducted between summer and late autumn of 915. The aim of the offensive was to install the Prince Ashot as the King of Armenia, and expel the Sajid forces that had occupied Armenia in the previous years. Ashot was provided with a large Byzantine army under the command of Domestikos Leo Phokas the Elder to enact his restoration, which was reinforced by contingents from several Armenian principalities during its march. The allied army successfully drove the Sajids out of Western Armenia, and Prince Ashot ascended the throne as Ashot II. To the south, separate Byzantine forces conducted adjacent offensives against Abbasid territories, in which large quantities of loot and prisoners were collected.

== Background ==
=== Sajid invasion of Armenia ===
In 909, a war broke out between the Sajids under Yusuf ibn Abi'l-Saj and Bagratid Armenia under Smbat I. Utilizing a divide and conquer strategy, Yusuf promised support for his ally Gagik Artsruni of Vaspurakan to bid for the throne of Armenia, and consequently stirred a civil war in Armenia to facilitate his subjugation of the country. Yusuf also secured the support of Adarnese IV of Iberia for this conflict. Following years of fighting, Smbat and his followers were forced to find refuge in the fortress of Kabouda, which the Sajid forces invested. After a protracted siege, Smbat surrendered himself to Yusuf in 914, hoping that this gesture would enable him to conclude a truce with the Sajids to end the war and spare his subjects from further suffering. However, Yusuf nonetheless executed Smbat. Armenian resistance against the Sajids continued under the leadership of Smbat's son, Ashot, who conducted a guerilla campaign against the invaders.

According to Hovhannes Draskhanakerttsi:

Ashot, like an eagle soaring through the sky, dashed forward swiftly after the ravenous foreigners who sent their raiding forces through our land. At first, in a short period, he reconquered and took possession of all the fortresses that were in his father’s domain and had been taken by the ostikan. He immediately put to the sword the guards [that had been left] by the Saracens, and having fortified the strongholds with guards, bulwarks and large amounts of provisions, he went in pursuit of the enemy, wherever there were raiding Ishmaelites

=== Byzantine–Armenian alliance ===
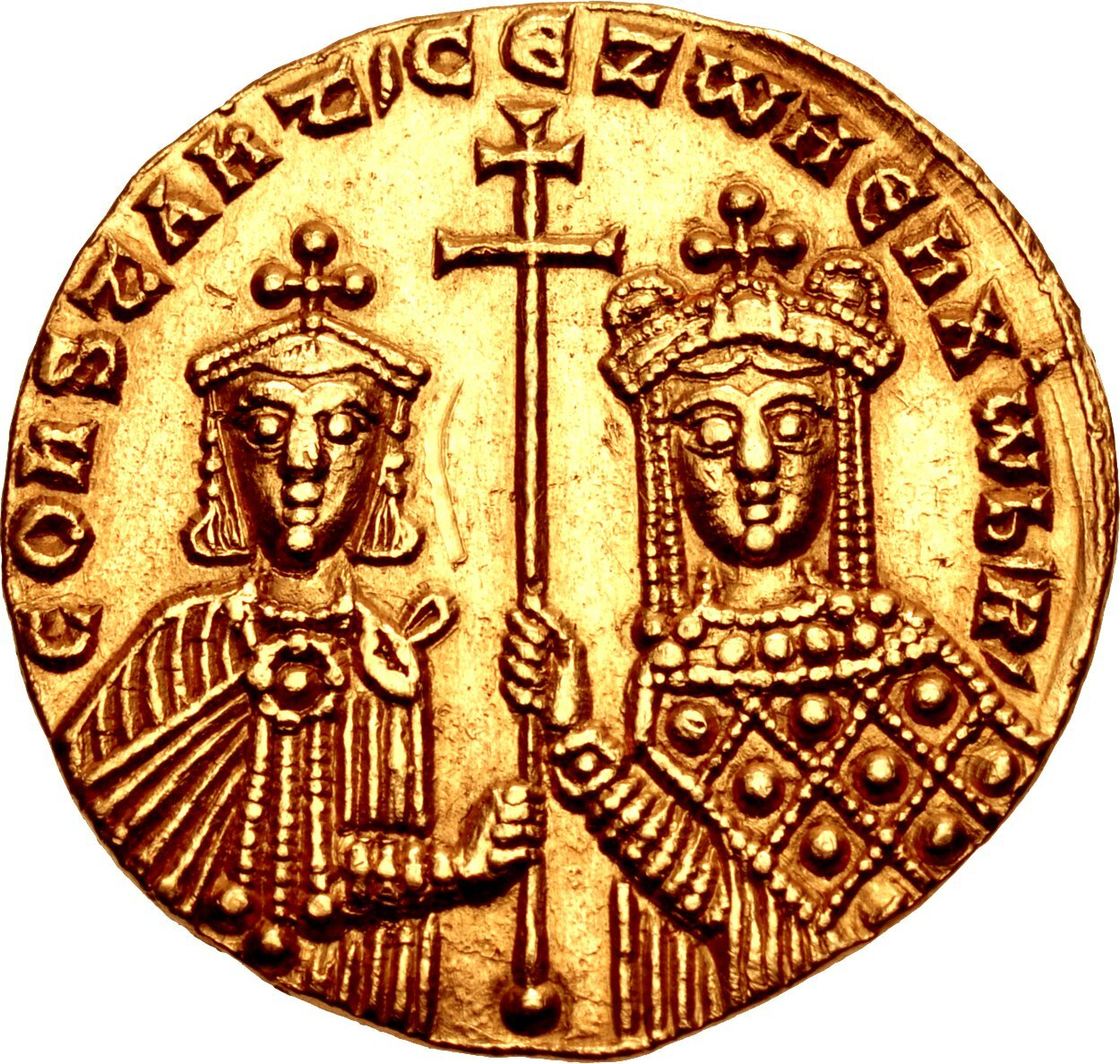
Gold Solidus of Emperor Constantine VII with his mother, the regent Zoe Karbonopsina

Although Ashot achieved limited successes in his resistance against the Sajids, he and his followers lacked the power to challenge the Sajid position in Armenia on a wider strategic level by themselves. Consequently, the Armenians were forced to seek military support from the Byzantine Empire. Dialogue between the neighbouring Christian powers was made via religious leaders, as the Catholicos Hovhannes Draskhanakerttsi exchanged letters with Nicholas Mystikos, the Patriarch of Constantinople. These efforts proved fruitful, as the Byzantines dispatched an envoy named Theodore to Ashot bearing gifts. Soon thereafter in late 914, Ashot travelled in person to Constantinople on a diplomatic visit, where he was received by the regent Empress Zoe.

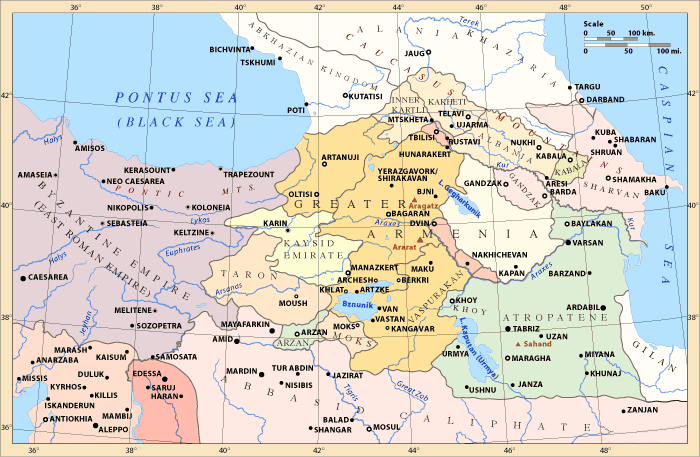
Map of Bagratid Armenia and its neighbours in the early 10th century

At the time, the Byzantines were themselves engaged in warfare against the Arabs along the lines of the Al-Thughur. In February or March 915, Bishr al-Afshini, the governor of Tarsus, had conducted a successful expedition into Byzantine territory, in which the Tarsiotes sacked multiple fortresses and took captive 2,000 Greeks, including 150 patrikioi. As the Sajid ascendancy in Armenia presented the threat of additional attacks into Asia Minor from the northeast, Zoe and her government began pursuing a military coalition between Byzantium and the Caucasian realms against the Muslims. The exchanges between the Catholicos and Patriarch had been centred around the formation of such an alliance, and in 914, Draskhanakerttsi persuaded the Georgian leader Adarnese IV to break from the Sajids and move towards a concord with Byzantium. In turn, when Ashot arrived in Constantinople, he was received with honours and gifts, and military support in the form of a large Byzantine army. In addition, the official recognition of Ashot as king of Armenia by the Byzantines was of considerable political importance to the prince, as it massively bolstered his legitimacy against rival claimants.

Having been kept abreast of the aspirations of Ashot and Byzantium for Armenia, Yusuf attempted to bolster the Sajid position with a pre-emptive attack against Gagik, who broke off his alliance with the Sajids in 914. However, a combined Armenian force, drawn from Vaspurakan, Mokh and Andsevatsi, succeeded in repulsing the Sajid attack. Yusuf's next measure was to crown Ashot’s cousin, a sparapet also called Ashot, as king when he came to Dvin. Yusuf sent the family members of sparapet Ashot to Sajid territories in Persia as hostages, in order to ensure his loyalty.

== Offensives in 915 ==
=== Strategy ===
For the Byzantines, making Armenia a Christian ally was paramount for the security of Anatolia, as it would block the route through which Arab forces could directly raid Byzantine territory along the northern section of the Al-Thughur, and thus limit strategic pressure to the southern sector. Conversely, an allied Armenia would exert strategic pressure against Muslim possessions in Transcaucasia and provide Byzantine armies with a launchpad for offensives in this region. The Byzantine strategy formulated for the 915 campaign in the east involved the use of at least two separate armies to conduct offensives on separate points along the Al-Thughur. Southern forces under the command of an unnamed logothete and Melias would focus its attack against Abbasid holdings in Cilicia and Germanikeia, while further North, the Byzantine army under the domestikos, likely to have been Leo Phokas the Elder at this time, would march into Armenia to restore prince Ashot to the throne. Due to the heavy handed treatment of Armenians by Yusuf ibn Abi'l-Saj, Ashot and his Byzantine allies could expect military support from the several disaffected Armenian lords in their bid to oust the Sajids, including Yusuf's former ally, Gagik. Strategically, the army of the Logothete would tie up Abbasid–Tarsiote forces along the southern parts of the Al-Thughur, and inhibit Arab forces in this sector from reinforcing the Sparapet Ashot and the Sajids in Armenia.

=== Campaigns in Cilicia and Mesopotamia ===
Byzantine forces further south along the Thughur likely conducted two or three offensives in 915. In the first attack under the command of Melias, the Byzantines captured and sacked the Arab-held fortress of Hisn Mansur. The second attack, which likely coincided with the offensive of Ashot and the domestikos into Armenia, advanced through the Anti-Taurus to attack Cilicia. There, the Byzantines under the command of the logothete fought and defeated a large Tarsiote army, with 600 Arab nobles falling in the battle, after which they carried their attack eastwards, to the environs of Samosata. Baghdad was forced to dispatch reinforcements to this sector, which finally prompted the withdrawal of the Byzantine army after a few skirmishes, but consequently, the Abbasids had little ability to interfere with events in Armenia. Meanwhile, Melias led a separate attack over the Al-Thughur, this time towards Germanikeia, where he defeated Arab forces and ravaged the area. The Byzantines took up to 50,000 Muslim soldiers and civilians captive during these attacks.

=== The Armenian campaign ===
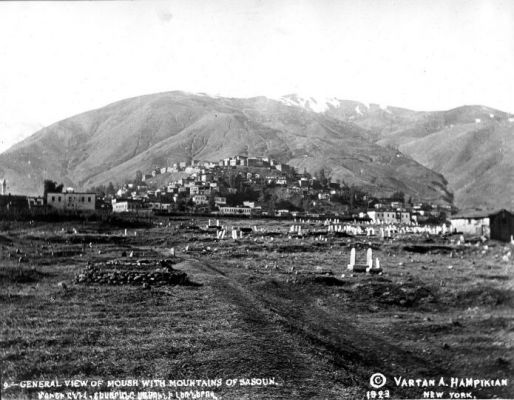
1923 Photograph of the city of Muş, former Taron, with ruins in the foreground

Countryside surrounding the town of Goght, in present day Armenia

Upon their arrival in Transcaucasia, Ashot and the domestikos were greeted by a delegation of Caucasian Christian leaders and noblemen, foremost amongst whom was the Iberian ruler Adarnese IV. With his rule officially sanctioned by the religious and political authorities of the Byzantine Empire and supported by them militarily, the Caucasian assembly followed Constantinople by officially recognising Ashot as king of Armenia. The Byzantine forces under the domestikos crossed into Armenia through Taron, until they arrived at the fortress of Goght. Although the garrison there resisted their advance, the Byzantines captured the fort after a siege and occupied it. When the Byzantines then advanced further into the vicinity of Ararat, the smbat of Syunik and a prince of Taron joined Ashot and the domastikos as allies. Sparapet Ashot and the Sajids attempted to oppose the Byzantine–Armenian offensive, but the domestikos' forces inflicted heavy losses upon them and forced their way through enemy territory until they reached the outskirts of Dvin, following which they withdrew due to the onset of heavy snow. By then, Ashot II had been securely installed as the Bagratid King in western Armenia. (Note: Konstantinos Takirtakoglou has reasoned that the Domestikos' siege of Dvin described by Stepanos Asoghik can be identified with the later Byzantine offensive to take this city in 927 under the leadership of John Kourkouas, but Steven Runciman's reconstruction connects the siege described in Asoghik's text with the Byzantine-Armenian campaign in 915, and considered it a separate siege to the one described by Ibn al-Athīr for 927)

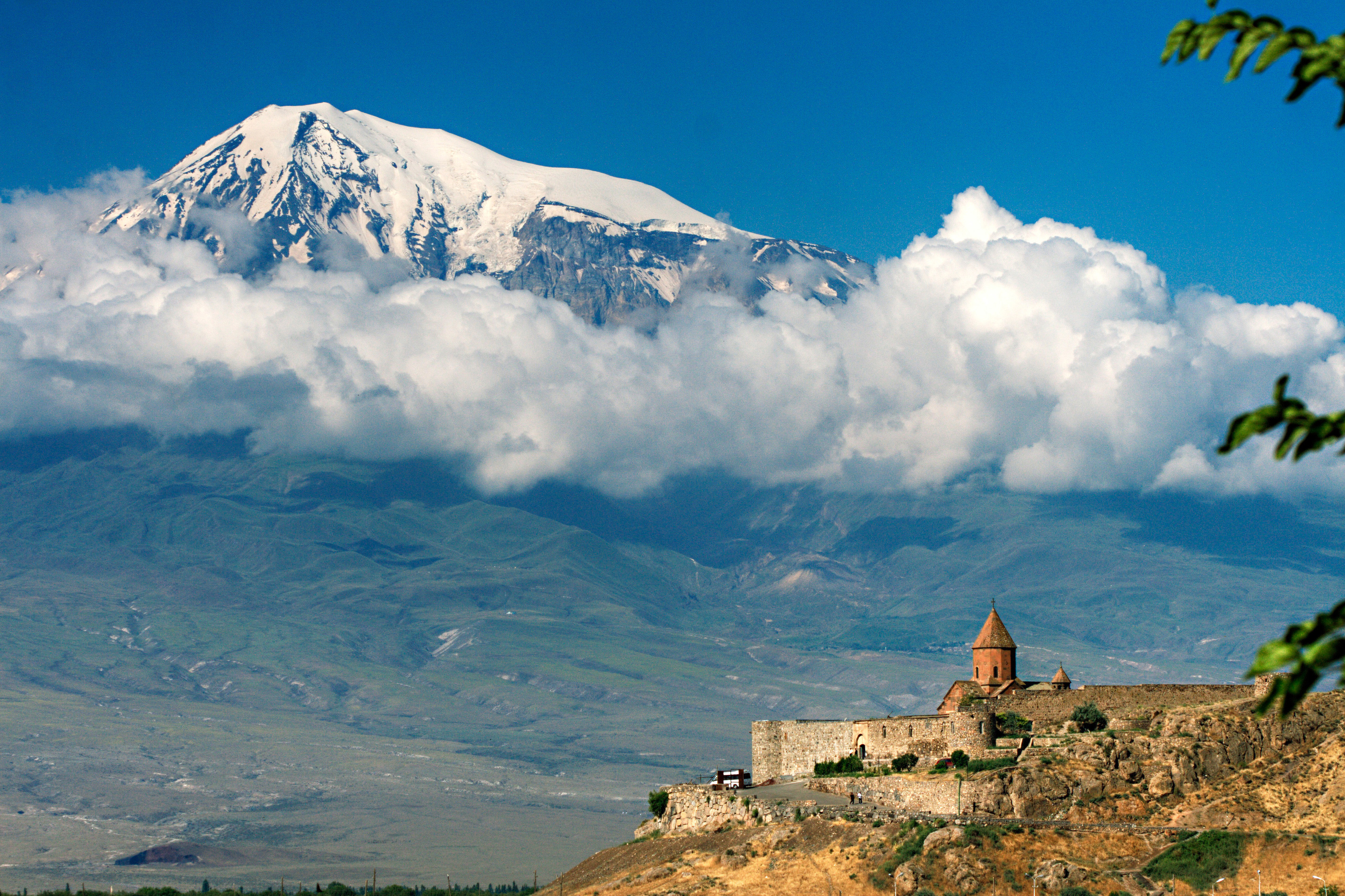
Historic Khor Virap monastery, with mount Ararat in the background

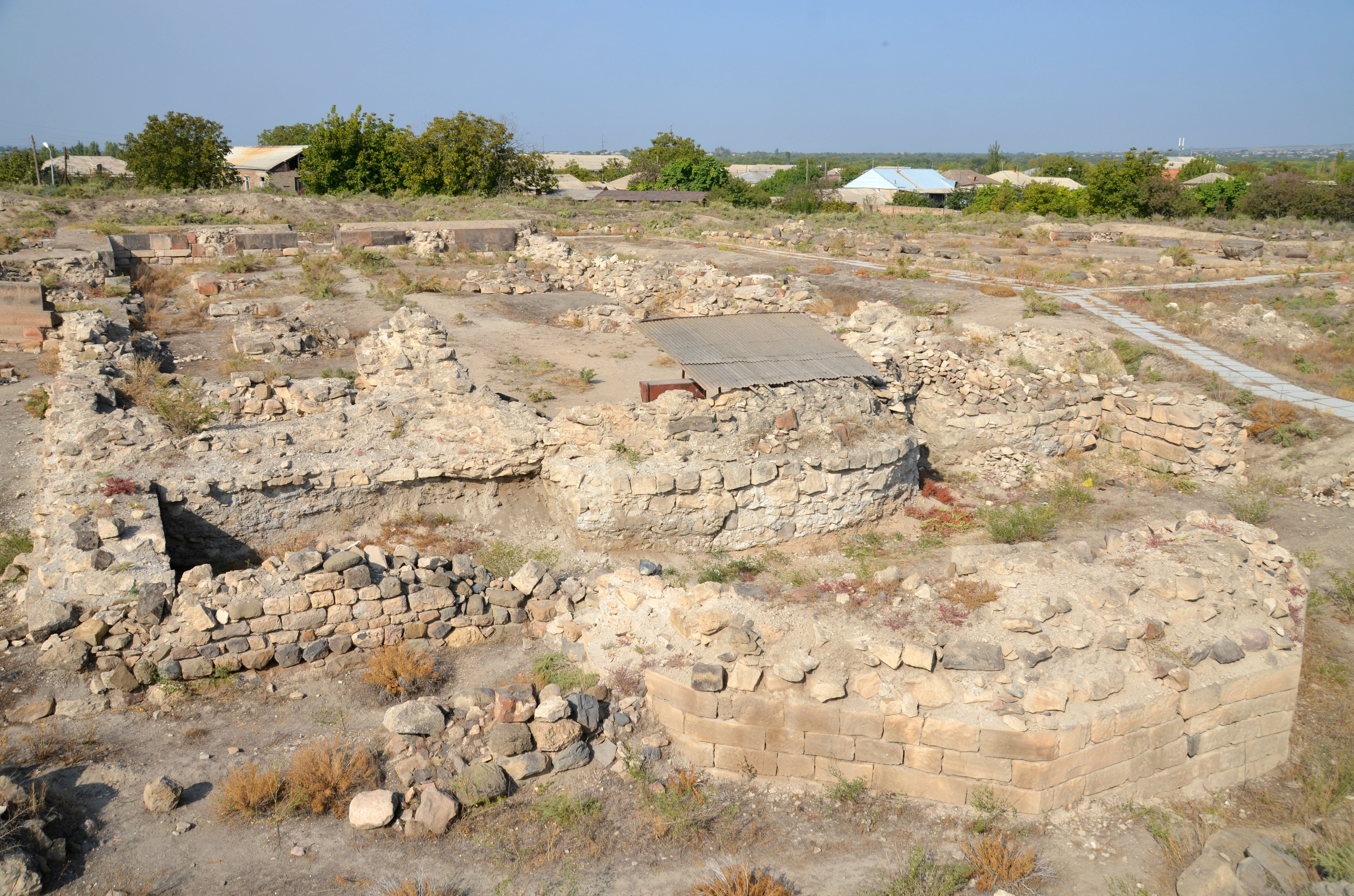
Ruins of Saint Gregory Cathedral on the site of medieval Dvin

== Aftermath ==
The success of the Byzantines in 915 garnered a military response by the Abbasids. In 916, Mu'nis al-Muzaffar, commander-in-chief of the Abbasid military, organised a two-pronged invasion into Byzantine territory. The Abbasid force, under Mu'nis' personal command, attacked Anatolia from the direction of Melitene, while Abu-l-Kasma led a raid from Tarsus. Mu'nis' expedition was successful, but the result of Abu-l-Kasma’s attack is not recorded in the Arab sources, and likely ended in defeat. The following year, As-Suml conducted raids from Tarsus by land and sea, which amassed considerable quantities of loot. However, what successes the Abbasids gained in 916 and 917 proved insufficient to counterract the strategic and material gains won by the Byzantines in 915, and the Abbasid position was soon compounded by the rift that emerged between the Caliph al-Muqtadir and Yusuf ibn Abi'l Saj, who revolted against the caliphate in 917.

The war between the Sajids and the caliphate limited the ability of either Muslim power to fight the Christian powers. The Byzantine government under Zoe was also eager to make peace on the eastern frontier, as it sought to concentrate military efforts against Bulgaria. In June, Byzantine envoys were received in Baghdad and a peace treaty was concluded on July 17. As part of this truce, a prisoner exchange was arranged for October of the same year, and as more Muslims were held in Byzantine captivity following the 915 campaigns, the Abbasids had to pay a ransom of 120,000 dinars to account for the surplus. (Note: The peace signed in 917 proved short-lived due to the crushing defeats sustained by the Byzantines during the war with Bulgaria in the same year, which encouraged the Abbasids to renege on their treaty in order to exploit the difficulties faced by the Byzantines in the West. From early 918 onwards, Abbasid forces led by Bishr al-Afshini, Jinni al-Safwani and Thamal of Tarsus conducted a series of raids against Asia Minor both by land and sea, which devastated Byzantine territories and carried off a significant amount of spoils)

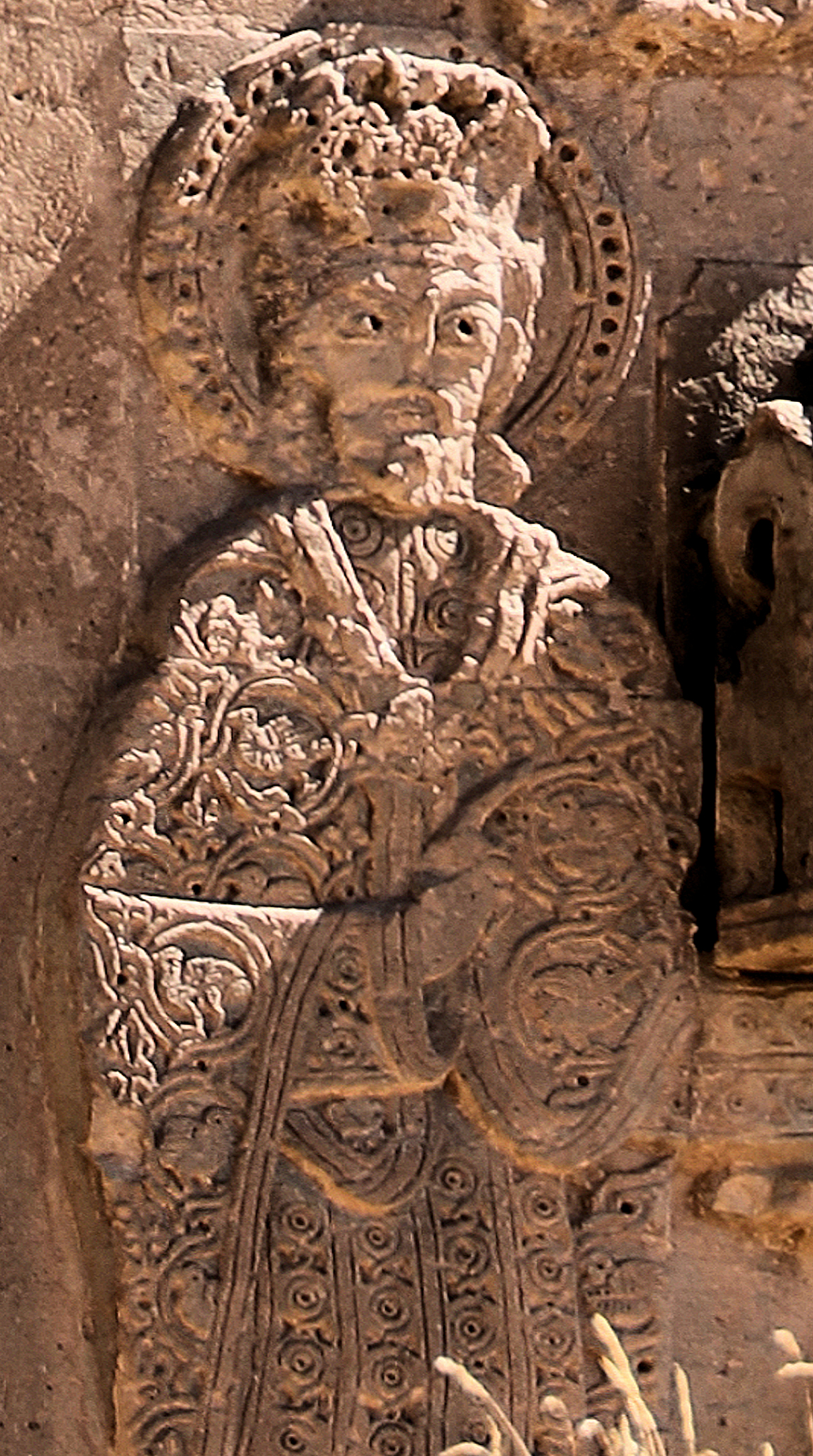
rock relief of King Gagik I Artsruni

With his position as king of Armenia consolidated, Ashot II and his forces conducted further campaigns against the Sajids and sparapet Ashot to recover additional territory. Ashot II expanded his domains as far east as Vagharschapat and captured the fortress of Schamschoulde from rebels, but could not capture Dvin, nor the rebellious province of Oudi. The outbreak of the Sajid–Abbasid conflict then marked a shift in Yusuf ibn Abi'l Saj's policy towards Armenia, with Yusuf recognising Ashot II as the legitimate ruler of Armenia in 917 or 918. Yusuf's successor, Subuk, continued the policy of reproachment with the Armenians, and in 919 bestowed upon Ashot the title of Shāhanshāh. In the same year, Ashot II made peace with his Sparapet Ashot, and was officially recognised as the Bagratid ruler by Gagik Artsruni. However, the Sajids did not make peace with Gagik, and attacks into Vaspurakan continued until 924.

== Bibliography ==
Primary sources

- Moravcsik, Gyula; Jenkins, Romilly, eds. (1967) [1949]. Constantine Porphyrogenitus: De Administrando Imperio (2. ed.). Washington: Dumbarton Oaks Center for Byzantine Studies.
- Wortley, John, ed. (2010). John Skylitzes: A Synopsis of Byzantine History, 811–1057. Cambridge: Cambridge University Press. ISBN 978-0-521-76705-7.

Secondary sources

- Vasiliev, A. A. (1968). Byzance et les Arabes, Tome II, 1ére partie: Les relations politiques de Byzance et des Arabes à L'époque de la dynastie macédonienne (867–959) (in French). French ed.: Henri Grégoire, Marius Canard. Brussels: Éditions de l'Institut de Philologie et d'Histoire Orientales.
- Runciman, Steven (1988) [1929]. The Emperor Romanus Lecapenus and His Reign: A Study of Tenth-Century Byzantium. Cambridge, United Kingdom: Cambridge University Press. ISBN 0-521-35722-5.
- Treadgold, Warren (1997). A History of the Byzantine State and Society. Stanford, California: Stanford University Press. ISBN 978-0804779371.
- Dédéyan, Gérard (1993). "Les Arméniens sur la frontière sud-orientale de Byzance, fin IXe - fin XIe siècles". La Frontière. Séminaire de recherche (in French). Lyon: Maison de l'Orient et de la Méditerranée Jean Pouilloux. pp. 67–85. ISBN 2-903264-50-3.
- Kaldellis, Anthony (2023). The New Roman Empire: A History of Byzantium. Oxford University Press. ISBN 978-0197549322.
- Takirtakoglou, Konstantinos (2021). "Ashot II Yerkat and the Byzantines: Allies to the End or Ultimately Enemies?". Bulletin of Matenadaran (32). ISSN 1829-054X.
