= Battle of Charpete =

Battle of Charpete (938)
- Part of the Arab–Byzantine wars
- Map of the Arab-Byzantine frontier zone
Date	9 October 938
Location	Near Harpoot
Result	Hamdanid victory

Belligerents
Byzantine Empire	Hamdanid dynasty

Commanders and leaders
John Kourkouas	Sayf al-Dawla

Strength
20,000 men	Unknown

Casualties and losses
Heavy; 70 patricians captured	Unknown

The Battle of Charpete was a military engagement between the Hamdanid Arabs and the Byzantine army near the fort of Charpete. The Arabs under Sayf al-Dawla defeated a Byzantine advance guard and forced John Kourkouas to retreat.

== Background ==
After the conquest of Melitene in 934 by the Byzantine general John Kourkouas, the Byzantines relaxed their war effort. Instead, they began pacifying the city and incorporating it into a theme of the empire. In 936, John Kourkouas resumed his military operations and captured Samosata, which was completely razed and its inhabitants granted safe conduct. After the fall of Melitene, the Hamdanids became the only major power in the frontier lines to resist the Byzantines. The Hamdanid general, Sayf al-Dawla, established himself in Amida. In 938, the Byzantines and the Abbasid Caliph held a peace treaty; the Byzantines wished their conquests to be recognized. Perhaps the most important reason for the peace was to deal with the Hamdanids' threat, who controlled all the Muslim frontier provinces from Mosul to Aleppo. The Hamdaninds did not consider themselves part of the treaty and began attacking the Byzantines.

== Battle ==
In September of the same year, Sayf al-Dawla launched his invasion. There he marched to the fortress of Harpoot (also called Charpete or Hisn Ziyad). Charpete was a fortress located on a high cliff bordering the southern bank of the Murat River and overlooking the Antzitene plain and the road leading to the Euphrates crossings towards Malatya. There, Sayf al-Dawla captured the fort and remained there for seven days, but at that time he learned of the arrival of the John Kourkouas with a large army to confront him. So he retreated, pursued by the Byzantine cavalry. Sayf al-Dawla stopped at a place further east of Charpete and decided to make a stand against them. The Byzantines divided their forces into several groups. A group of about 20,000 men was cut off from the rest of the army. Sayf ad-Dawla engaged this unit in battle on the 8th of October, which raged until nightfall. Sayf al-Dawla charged at the Byzantines with his Ghulam cavalry, routing them. The Byzantines suffered a severe defeat, leaving 70 patricians as prisoners, in addition to a large number of prisoners. Among the spoils taken by the Arabs were the throne and seat of Kourkouas. John learned of the defeat and retreated from the field.

== Aftermath ==
The victory at Charpete allowed the Arabs to continue their offensive. In 939, Sayf al-Dawla attacked Armenia, capturing several forts and forcing a number of Armenian and Iberian princes to his rule. He received a letter from the Byzantine emperor, berating him for disrupting the peace treaty. Sayf al-Dawla went to besiege Koloneia, but Kourkouas forced him to retreat.

== Sources ==
- Alexander Vasiliev (1968), Byzantium and the Arabs, Vol. 2: Political relations between Byzantines and Arabs during the Macedonian Dynasty (In French).
- Warren T. Treadgold (1997), A History of the Byzantine State and Society.
- Steven Runciman (1988), The Emperor Romanus Lecapenus and his reign : a study of tenth-century Byzantium.
- Georgios Theotokis (2018), Byzantine Military Tactics in Syria and Mesopotamia in the Tenth Century: A Comparative Study.
- Alicia Walker (2012), The Emperor and the World, Exotic Elements and the Imaging of Middle Byzantine Imperial Power, Ninth to Thirteenth Centuries C.E.
