= Mleh =

Mleh may refer to:

- Mleh, Prince of Armenia (before 1120 – 1170)
- Melias (died 934), Byzantine general, founder of the theme of Lykandos
