= Lykandos =

Byzantine fortress and military-civilian province

Theme of Lykandos Λυκανδός, θέμα Λυκανδοῦ
- Theme of the Byzantine Empire
- 903–1070s
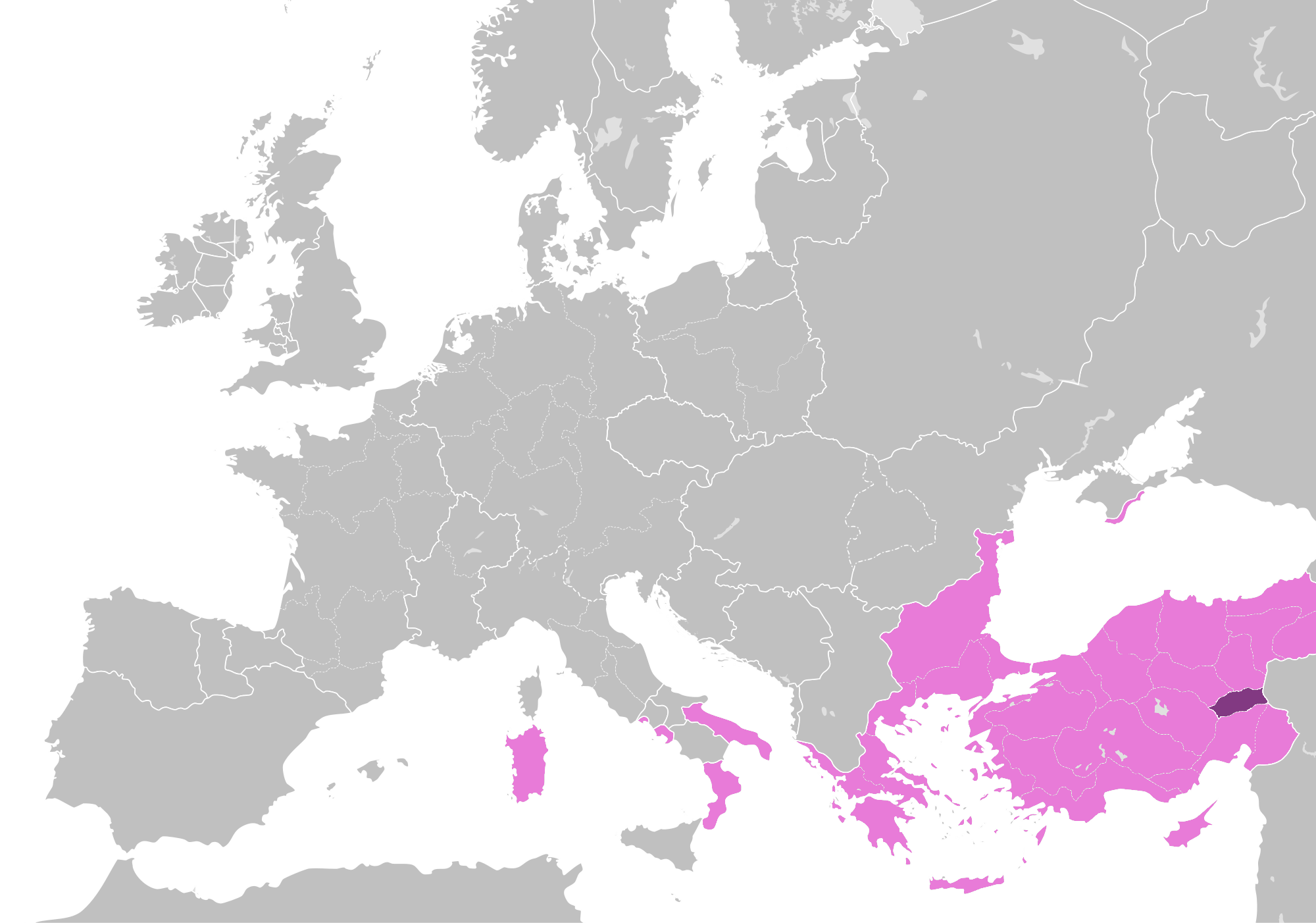
- Map of the Theme of Lykandos within the Byzantine Empire in 1000 AD.
- Capital: Lykandos fortress
- Historical era: Middle Ages
  - Arrival of Melias: 903
  - Elevation to theme: before 916
  - Fall to the Seljuks: after 1071

Lykandos or Lycandus (Greek: Λυκανδός), known as Djahan in Armenian, was the name of a Byzantine fortress and military-civilian province (or "theme"), known as the Theme of Lykandos (θέμα Λυκανδοῦ), in the 10th–11th centuries.

== History ==
=== Origin and early history ===
The fortress of Lykandos was located in the area of modern Elbistan in southeastern Turkey, on the Antitaurus Mountains. It emerged as a major fortified military centre on the eastern Byzantine frontier under Emperor Leo VI the Wise (r. 886–912), through the actions of the Armenian leader Mleh (Melias in Greek sources), who settled there in 903, establishing a quasi-autonomous lordship. The area was of critical strategic importance, lying directly on the frontier zone between the Byzantines and the Muslim border emirates of Syria and Upper Mesopotamia, and commanding one of the principal routes through the mountains into Byzantine Anatolia.

In 905, however, Melias was expelled from the Byzantine Empire (along with other Armenian nobles) in the aftermath of the failed rebellion of Andronikos Doukas against Leo VI. Recalled in 908, his lordship was formally sanctioned by Leo through his elevation to the status of kleisourarches of Lykandos. Melias was tasked with refortifying the castle, which lay in ruins, and with settling and garrisoning the district, which lay uninhabited. Melias was swiftly successful in his efforts: the region, able to provide for men and horses and "abundant in grazing lands" according to Constantine Porphyrogennetos, was settled with Armenians, and soon, Melias managed to expand his control over the neighbouring mountain districts of Tzamandos, whose castle he built, and of Symposion (modern Kaleköy), whose original commander, the Armenian Ismael, had been killed by the Arabs.

Arab sources make clear that the new and expanding province posed a direct threat, particularly to the nearby emirate of Melitene. A fierce Arab assault was launched against Lykandos in 909 but it failed, achieving only to reclaim some outlying positions, while in 915, Melias's troops ravaged Arab territory as far as Germanikeia (modern Kahramanmaraş). The importance of Lykandos and the successes of its commander were duly recognized, and by 916, it had been elevated in status to a full theme. Modern historians consider the promotion of Melias and his jurisdiction also as a political expedient to counterbalance the power of Constantine Doukas in the nearmy theme of Charsianon, but whatever the short-term political calculations, the theme of Lykandos proved to have a long existence.

=== History of Lykandos as a theme ===
Based on the rich sigillographic evidence, Lykandos was organized like the other themes, and possessed the full array of thematic officials. Administratively, it was often run together with the neighbouring themes of Melitene and Tzamandos. It does not appear to have constituted a bishopric.

In 917, the troops of Lykandos participated in the disastrous campaign against Bulgaria that ended in the Battle of Acheloos. The theme's forces would play a major role in the Arab–Byzantine wars of the early and middle 10th century, especially in the campaigns of John Kourkouas, which expanded the imperial frontier eastwards to the Euphrates and into Armenia and Syria, as well as in the civil wars of the later 10th century.

In the 960s, the magnate Eustathios Maleinos, who dominated Charsianon, also extended his influence over Lykandos. In c. 969, Maleinos was even for a time joint strategos (military governor) of Lykandos and the newly captured city of Antioch. This dual arrangement is also in evidence over the following years, while in the mid-11th century the governorship of Lykandos appears to have been held in tandem with the post of katepano (regional military commander) of Melitene.

The area was lost by the Byzantines after the Battle of Manzikert in 1071, when it was overrun by the Seljuk Turks, but it nevertheless appears in the formal grant of territory by Emperor Alexios I Komnenos (r. 1081–1118) to Bohemond I of Antioch in 1108. According to Matthew of Edessa, in 1155-1156 the ruler of Cappadocia, Yaqub Arslan, uprooted the people of Lykandos, along with the whole Christian population of Plastentia and nearby Gaihan, 70,000 in total, and settled them in his lands.

== Sources ==
- Constantine Porphyrogennetos (1840). Niebuhr, Barthold Georg (ed.). De thematibus et de administrando imperio. E. Weber.
- Foss, Clive (1991). "Lykandos". In Kazhdan, Alexander (ed.). The Oxford Dictionary of Byzantium. Oxford and New York: Oxford University Press. p. 1258. ISBN 0-19-504652-8.
- Kazhdan, Alexander; Cutler, Antony (1991). "Melias". In Kazhdan, Alexander (ed.). The Oxford Dictionary of Byzantium. Oxford and New York: Oxford University Press. p. 1334. ISBN 0-19-504652-8.
- Leveniotis, Georgios Athanasios (2007). Η πολιτική κατάρρευση του Βυζαντίου στην Ανατολή: το ανατολικό σύνορο και η κεντρική Μικρά Ασία κατά το β' ήμισυ του 11ου αι [The Political Collapse of Byzantium in the East: The Eastern Frontier and Central Asia Minor During the Second Half of the 11th Century] (PhD thesis) (in Greek). Aristotle University of Thessaloniki. doi:10.12681/eadd/19246. hdl:10442/hedi/19246.
- Pertusi, A. (1952). Constantino Porfirogenito: De Thematibus (in Italian). Rome: Biblioteca Apostolica Vaticana.
- Treadgold, Warren (1997). A History of the Byzantine State and Society. Stanford, California: Stanford University Press. ISBN 0-8047-2630-2.
- Whittow, Mark (1996). The Making of Byzantium, 600–1025. Berkeley and Los Angeles, California: University of California Press. ISBN 978-0-520-20496-6.
