= Tzamandos =

Medieval fortress in Anatolia

Tzamandos (Greek: Τζαμανδός) was a medieval fortress in Anatolia and is today situated in a neighbourhood of Pınarbaşı, Kayseri. It was constructed in 908 by the Byzantine-Armenian general Melias and was a Byzantine kleisoura and continued as a minor settlement until the early Ottoman period.

== History ==
Tzamandos (situated in the center on the river Onopniktes) in the Byzantine-Arab frontier

=== Origins ===
Tzamandos was built by the Byzantine Armenian general Melias in 908 in the former no-man's land between the Abbasid Caliphate and the Byzantine Empire. Tzamandos then became a kleisoura, which included the whole river valley of the Zamantı down to the neighbourhood of Hanköy and the Uzun Yayla, and most likely belonged to the theme of Lykandos which had been created in 914. The town became also soon the seat of a Byzantine bishop. The new region was repopulated by the Byzantine authorities primarily with Armenians and Syrians, which resulted in the establishing of the Syrian Orthodox bishopric of Simandu in 955, which lasted until 1180. When Bardas Skleros revolted in 976, the fortress joined his efforts.

=== Armenian rule ===
In 1022, the kleisoura of Tzamandos was given as property to Davit while his father Senacherim, the former King of Vaspurakan, was invested with Sebasteia, Larissa and Abara. Tzamandos was later taken away from the Artsrunis and given to Gagik of Kars after he was forced to abdicate in 1065. The Armenian Catholicos resided in the town from 1065 until 1069 when he moved to Tablur. Tzamandos was attacked by the Seljuks in 1068 and 1070. Upon Gagik's death, he was succeeded by his daughter Maria, who was in possession of the fortress possibly until 1085.

=== Turkish rule ===
According to the Saljuq-nama, Tzamandos (which it called Zamandū) became part of the principality of the Danishmendids after the 1071 battle of Manzikert. Around 1143/1144, the Danishmendid possessions were split up and Tzamandos fell, possibly together with Larissa, to Dhu'l-Nun. It is not certain whether Tzamandos was its own fief (iqta' or was grouped together with Kayseri. Though Kayseri later became the more important regional center, there is no need to think of Tzamandos as having a lower population at the time.

In 1168, the Seljuk Kilij Arslan II drove out Dhu'l-Nun of his possessions and Tzamandos thus fell under the Sultanate of Rum as an appanage of Kayseri. When Kilij Arslan II divided his sultanate between his sons, the region fell to his son Mughis ad-Din Tughrul. Seljuk building activity in the region did not start until the 1230s, when the trade passing by Tzamandos and Elbistan led to rebuilding of the fortress of Tzamandos which was now also used as a prison.

The fortress became then known as Melik Gazi and the main settlement was dispersed probably in the early Ottoman period so that just a small village remained. In his Cihannümâ, 17th-century Ottoman writer Katib Chelebi described Zamantı (Tzamandos) as an Armenian frontier city also known as Zabtar.

== Bibliography ==
- Beihammer, Alexander Daniel (2017). Byzantium and the Emergence of Muslim-Turkish Anatolia, Ca. 1040-1130. Taylor & Francis. ISBN 978-1351983860.
- Foss, Clive (1991). "Tzamandos". In Kazhdan, Alexander (ed.). The Oxford Dictionary of Byzantium. Oxford and New York: Oxford University Press. pp. 2134–2135. ISBN 0-19-504652-8.
- Hagen, G.; Dankoff, R. (2021). An Ottoman Cosmography: Translation of Cihānnümā. Handbook of Oriental Studies. Section 1 The Near and Middle East (in Latin). Brill. ISBN 978-90-04-44133-0.
- Sinclair, T. A. (31 December 1989). Eastern Turkey: An Architectural & Archaeological Survey, Volume II. Pindar Press. ISBN 978-0-907132-33-2.
- Vest, Bernd Andreas (2007). Geschichte der Stadt Melitene und der umliegenden Gebiete: vom Vorabend der arabischen bis zum Abschluss der türkischen Eroberung (um 600-1124) (in German). Dr. Kovač. ISBN 978-3-8300-2575-7.
