= John Kourkouas' Mesopotamian campaign =

Campaigns in Northern Mesopotamia, 942–944

Mesopotamia campaign of John Kourkouas
- Part of the Arab–Byzantine wars
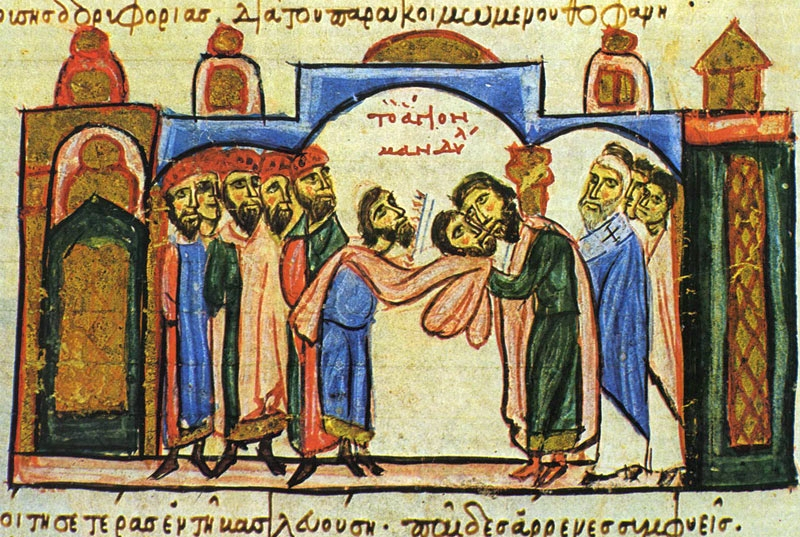
- The surrender of the Holy Mandylion by the inhabitants of Edessa in Mesopotamia to the Byzantines in 944.
| Date | January 942 – Early 944 |
| Location | Northern Mesopotamia |
| Result | Byzantine victory |

Belligerents
| Byzantine Empire | Abbasid Caliphate; Hamdanid dynasty Muslim border emirates. |

Commanders and leaders
| John Kourkouas | al-Muttaqi; Nasir al-Dawla |

Strength
| 80,000 men | Unknown |

Casualties and losses
| Unknown | Heavy |

The Mesopotamian campaign of 942–944 was the final and most successful offensive led by the Byzantine general John Kourkouas during the reign of Romanos I Lekapenos. Taking advantage of political instability within the Abbasid Caliphate and the distraction of the Hamdanid rulers, the Byzantines conducted deep raids into northern Syria and Upper Mesopotamia, culminating in the capture of the Mandylion from Edessa. The campaign marked a turning point in the long-running Arab–Byzantine wars and demonstrated the resurgence of Byzantine military power in the East.

== Background ==
In the final years of the Byzantine emperor Romanos I Lekapenos, the Arabs became weaker in resisting Byzantium's advance. The Abbasid Caliph al-Muttaqi had to face mutiny by his Turkish troops in 941. This forced him to abandon Baghdad and call the Hamdanids in Mesopotamia for help. In the year 942, the Hamdanid emir Nasir al-Dawla retook Baghdad. Afterwards, he was named as the governor of Mesopotamia and northern Syria. The occupation of the Abbasids and Hamdanids in their conflicts gave Byzantium a great opportunity to raid them freely at will without resistance. In the spring of 941, the Byzantine general and the Domestic of the Schools, John Kourkouas, prepared an army to raid the Arab territory.

But before any Byzantine army could attack, a Rus fleet attacked Constantinople. This forced John to delay his campaign and return for the capital's defense. It was not until September of 941 that the Rus were finally defeated. Afterwards, the army returned to resume their unfinished campaign. John's army was reportedly large, numbering 80,000 men.

== Campaign ==
Northern Mesopotamia and Syria where Kourkouas sacked several cities

In January 942, Kourkouas launched his long-planned offensive. Moving into northern Syria, he raided the region around Aleppo and captured the town of Hamus, reportedly taking around 10,000 prisoners. Although a counter-raid from Tarsus was mounted by Muslim forces, it failed to halt the Byzantine advance. Later in the same year, Kourkouas advanced through southern Armenia via the allied principality of Taron. His forces sacked major Mesopotamian cities, including Arzen, Martyropolis, and Amida. Afterwards, Kourkouas remained in enemy territory during the winter, a highly unusual and aggressive strategy, challenging Hamdanid rule.

By early 943, he had pushed deeper into Upper Mesopotamia, capturing Nisibis and turning his direction towards Edessa. Edessa was famously known to possess the Christian relic called Mandylion. Kourkouas wanted to secure the relic. He approached the town and declared to its inhabitants that Edessa would be spared from sacking and Muslim captives would be released in exchange for the relic. The Edessans were hesitant to make a choice, so they dispatched a message to the Abbasid Caliph for help. Meanwhile, Kourkouas spent the summer sacking Mesopotamian cities. In May he sacked Dara and Ras al-Ayn in November, where he stayed for two days, capturing 1,000 prisoners.

In early 944, Kourkouas was again at Edessa. The inhabitants agreed to give the relic in exchange for 200 prisoners and a peace treaty. After the capture of the holy relic, Kourkouas concluded his campaign. Throughout the campaign, the Byzantines did not attempt to garrison the cities they captured but rather sacked them and concluded some sort of peace treaty with them.

== Aftermath ==
John Kourkouas's campaign was the first major Byzantine into the Far East in 300 years since Heraclius. His campaign turned the tide of the Arab-Byzantine wars and began a series of Byzantine victories against the Arabs. The most significant outcome of the campaign was the acquisition of the Mandylion, which was transported with great ceremony to Constantinople in August 944. Its arrival was celebrated as a major religious triumph and greatly enhanced the prestige of the Byzantine Empire.

Politically, Kourkouas’ success elevated him to great prominence. The prestige gained from the acquisition of the Mandylion made him one of the most celebrated generals of his time, though his growing popularity reportedly caused concern within the imperial court. At the end of 944, Kourkouas was removed from his post. Romanos became ill and passed away.

== Sources ==
- Steven Runciman (1988), The Emperor Romanus Lecapenus and his reign : a study of tenth-century Byzantium.
- Georgios Chatzelis (2019), Byzantine Military Manuals as Literary Works and Practical Handbooks. The Case of the Tenth-Century Sylloge Tacticorum.
- Warren Treadgold (1997), A History of the Byzantine State and Society.
