= Conquest of Melitene (934) =

- Part of the Arab–Byzantine wars
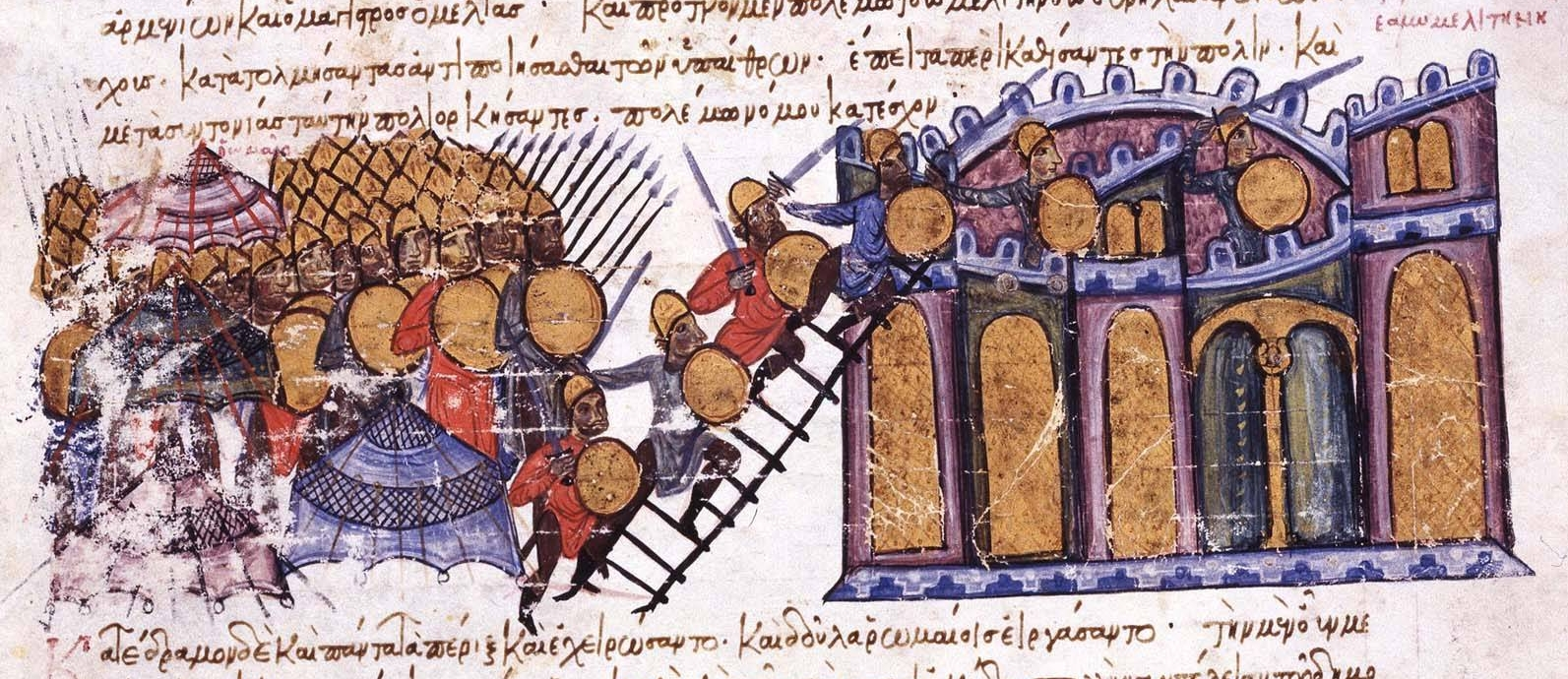
- The conquest of Melitene by the Byzantines in 934
| Date | 19 May 934 |
| Location | Malatya, Turkey |
| Result | Byzantine victory |

Belligerents
| Byzantine Empire | Abbasid Caliphate: Emirate of Melitene |

Commanders and leaders
| John Kourkouas; Theophilos Kourkouas | Unknown |

Strength
| 50,000 men | Unknown |

The Conquest of Melitene was a pivotal Byzantine victory led by General John Kourkouas, marking the first major annexation of Muslim-held territory in the East after centuries of Arab-Byzantine wars. The city, a key Arab emirate and base for raids into Anatolia, surrendered on May 19, 934, after a long blockade, turning the tide of war in Byzantium's favor.

== Background ==
In the 10th century, the Abbasid Caliphate was in a weak position financially and militarily. In order to face the resurgent Byzantine Empire, the Abbasid Caliph al-Muqtadir granted the almost autonomous northern Mesopotamia to the Hamdanids between 930 and 931. The active involvement of the Hamdanids in the frontier, which would disrupt Byzantine activities until the 960s. A major Hamdanid figurehead was Sayf al-Dawla, who inflicted defeats on the Byzantines. Between 931 and 940, they launched raids into Byzantine territory and fought off their expeditions against Armenia. They also managed to bring half of it to their control.

However, the Hamdanids and the Abbasids were plagued with internal conflicts. The Byzantines took advantage of this and took initiative to launch campaigns against the Arabs' frontier cities. The first goal they set their eyes upon was the city of Melitene. This city was a major launching point of raids. It was under the authority of an independent emir who acknowledged the Abbasid authority. Besides being a major military base, it was also strategically important since it was close to the Anti-Taurus Mountains, which allowed them to control the plains and neutralize Anatolian defenses.

== Byzantine advances ==
In the year 926, the Byzantines under John Kourkouas and Melias attacked Melitene and captured the city, but the citadel held out and repelled them. Afterwards, the city turned to the Caliph for help, but nothing came of it due to the Caliph's internal conflicts. Further Byzantine attacks in 928 and 929 were failures. However, the Byzantines had no intention of leaving Melitene alone. In 932, the Byzantines attacked again, but the Arab defector Bunayy ibn Nafis, who seems to have been playing a double game, at the encouragement of Mu'nis al-Muzaffar, who was then in Mosul in rebellion against the caliph, dissuaded them from attacking Melitene that year. In 933, the Byzantines returned and managed to subjugate most of the country around Melitene.

== Conquest ==
In the spring of 934, the Byzantines returned again. Under John Kourkouas and Theophilos Kourkouas, they brought with them a large army totaling 50,000, which included Armenian troops. As was customary, the entire region surrounding Melitene was subjected to terrible devastation, but the city itself put up a fierce and prolonged resistance. The Byzantines switched to blockade and starved the city and its inhabitants into famine. Finally, on the 19th of May, the city surrendered. John had two tents erected, one of which was surmounted by a cross. It was declared to the population that all those Muslims who consented to embrace Christianity could go to the tent with the cross and in that case would recover their families and property; those who, on the contrary, wished to remain Muslim should go to the other tent and would be taken by the Byzantines to a place where they would be safe and released.

The attachment to their families and property compelled a large number of Muslims to go to the tent with the cross and adopt Christianity; the others were taken by a patrician who was to bring them to safety in Muslim territory. As is known, Muslim prisoners who adopted Christianity and entered into marriage alliances with Christians were exempted for three years from certain taxes.

== Aftermath ==
The conquest of Melitene had a huge impact on the Islamic world. The city was turned to Kouratoria, an imperial estate run by and for the benefit of the crown, which gained a huge cash infusion from it. A large quantity of gold and silver is extracted from it each year. With the fall of the city, the Hamdanids became the only regional power to resist the Byzantines.

== Sources ==
- Alexander Vasiliev (1968), Byzantium and the Arabs, Vol. 2: Political relations between Byzantines and Arabs during the Macedonian Dynasty (In French).
- Georgios Chatzelis (2019), Byzantine Military Manuals as Literary Works and Practical Handbooks: Th Case of the Tenth-Century Sylloge Tacticorum.
- Anthony Kaldellis (2024), The New Roman Empire, A History of Byzantium.
- Warren T. Treadgold (1997), A History of the Byzantine State and Society.
