= Sa'id ibn Hamdan =

Abbasid provincial governor and military leader (died c.935)

Family tree of the Hamdanid dynasty

Sa'id ibn Hamdan (Arabic: ابو علاء سعيد بن حمدان, romanized: Abu ʿAlāʾ Saʿīd ibn Ḥamdān) was an early member of the Hamdanid dynasty who served as provincial governor and military leader under the Abbasid Caliphate. He was the father of the celebrated poet Abu Firas al-Hamdani.

== Biography ==
Sa'id was a son of the Hamdanid family's patriarch, Hamdan ibn Hamdun. His family belonged to the Banu Taghlib tribe, established in the Jazira since before the Muslim conquests. In a pattern repeated across the Abbasid Caliphate, the Taghlibi leaders took advantage of the collapse of central caliphal authority during the decade-long Anarchy at Samarra (861–870) to assert increasing control over their particular area, centred on Mosul. Despite the subsequent re-assertion of caliphal authority under al-Mu'tadid (r. 892–902), the family was able to retain and consolidate its influence in the area thanks to Sa'id's brother Husayn ibn Hamdan, who became a distinguished general in Abbasid service. Husayn rebelled in c. 915 after quarrelling with the vizier, and was executed in 918, but his brothers remained loyal to the Abbasid government and were entrusted with senior positions. In 927/8, Sa'id and his brothers served in the caliphal army sent to stop the Qarmatians of Bahrayn from reaching Baghdad.

Along with his brother Abu'l-Sarja Nasr, Sa'id vied with his nephew Hasan, the future Nasir al-Dawla, for control of Mosul. In 931, following the conquest of the frontier emirate of Melitene by the Byzantines under John Kourkouas, Caliph al-Muqtadir (r. 908–932) appointed him governor of Mosul, with the task of recovering the city. Setting out in October, Sa'id managed to break the Byzantine siege of Samosata, before moving onto Melitene. The local Byzantine garrison, composed of followers of the Armenian general Melias, panicked and massacred many of the inhabitants for fear of an uprising against them; they then destroyed as much of the city as they could and abandoned it. Sa'id took over control of the city, appointed one of his lieutenants as governor, and returned to Mosul. From there he launched a raid into Byzantine territory in November. Hasan regained Mosul in 934, but again Sa'id's intrigues at court caused him to lose it. As a result, Hasan had his uncle assassinated and fled to Armenia, whence he returned in late 935 to become once more Mosul's governor. Consolidating his position, Hasan founded the practically independent Hamdanid emirate of Mosul, and ruled it until 967.

Through a Byzantine Greek slave concubine (an umm walad, freed after giving birth to her master's child), Sa'id was the father of the distinguished general and poet Abu Firas al-Hamdani. Another son, Husayn, served as a general under Nasir al-Dawla and Sayf al-Dawla, while his daughter Shakinah became the wife of Sayf al-Dawla and the mother of his successor, Sa'd al-Dawla.

== Sources ==
- Canard, Marius (1971). "Ḥamdānids". In Lewis, B.; Ménage, V. L.; Pellat, Ch. & Schacht, J. (eds.). The Encyclopaedia of Islam, Second Edition. Volume III: H–Iram. Leiden: E. J. Brill. pp. 126–131. doi:10.1163/1573-3912_islam_COM_0259. OCLC 495469525.
- El Tayib, Abdullah (1990). "Abū Firās al-Ḥamdānī". In Ashtiany, Julia; Johnstone, T. M.; Latham, J. D.; Serjeant, R. B.; Smith, G. Rex (eds.). ʿAbbasid Belles-Lettres. Cambridge: Cambridge University Press. pp. 315–327. ISBN 0-521-24016-6.
- Gibb, H.A.R. (1960). "Abū Firās". In Gibb, H. A. R.; Kramers, J. H.; Lévi-Provençal, E.; Schacht, J.; Lewis, B. & Pellat, Ch. (eds.). The Encyclopaedia of Islam, Second Edition. Volume I: A–B. Leiden: E. J. Brill. pp. 119–120. doi:10.1163/1573-3912_islam_SIM_0183. OCLC 495469456.
- Kennedy, Hugh (2004). The Prophet and the Age of the Caliphates: The Islamic Near East from the 6th to the 11th Century (Second ed.). Harlow: Longman. ISBN 978-0-582-40525-7.
- Lilie, Ralph-Johannes; Ludwig, Claudia; Pratsch, Thomas; Zielke, Beate (2013). Prosopographie der mittelbyzantinischen Zeit Online. Berlin-Brandenburgische Akademie der Wissenschaften. Nach Vorarbeiten F. Winkelmanns erstellt (in German). Berlin and Boston: De Gruyter.
