= Siege of Dvin (927) =

Byzantine army siege in medieval Armenia

- Part of the Arab–Byzantine wars
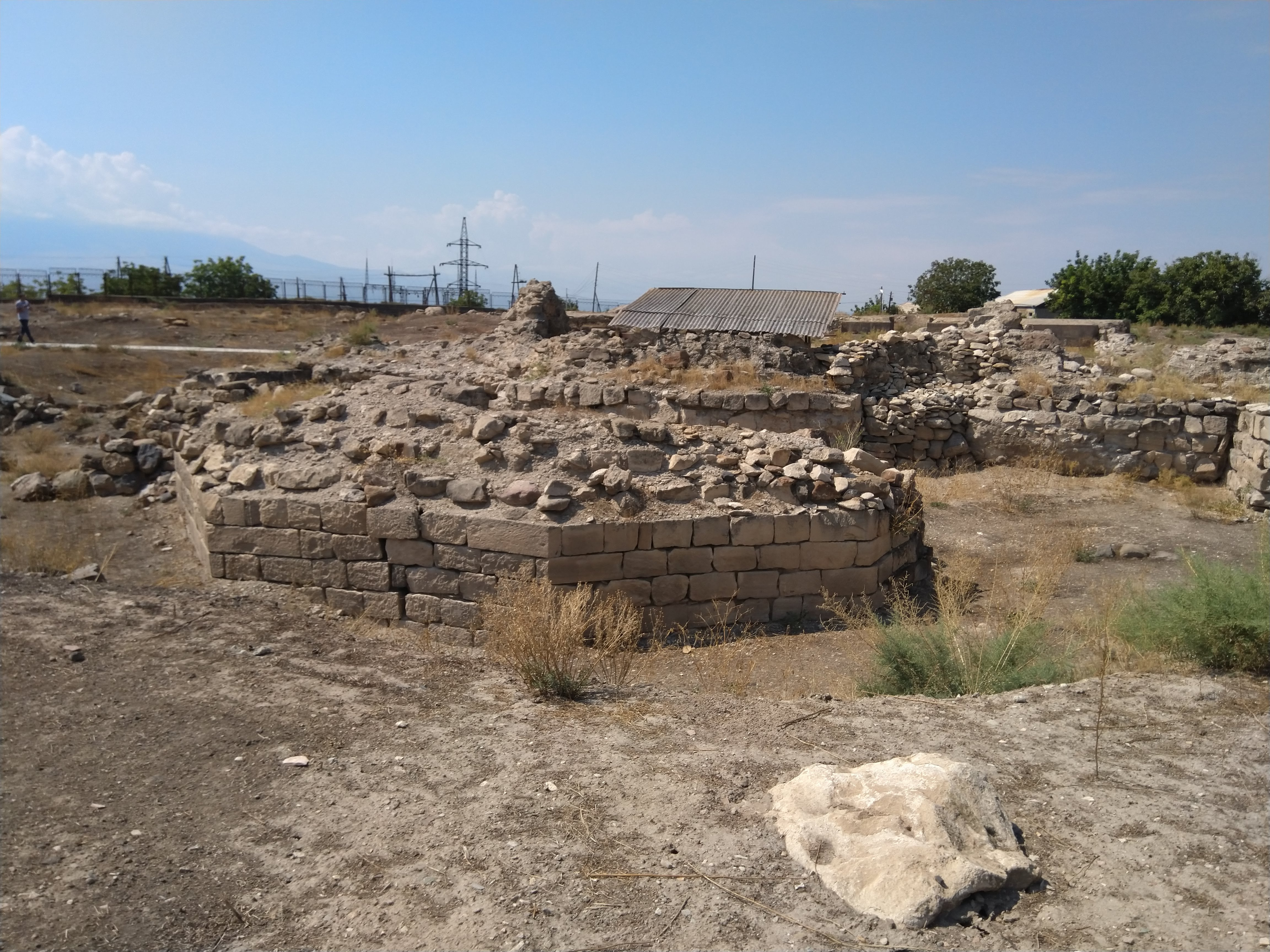
- Ruins of Dvin
Date	Summer 927
Location	Dvin, Armenia 40°0′16″N 44°34′42″E
Result	Sajid victory

Belligerents
Byzantine Empire	Sajid dynasty

Commanders and leaders
John Kourkouas	Nasr al-Subki

Casualties and losses
10,000 killed	Unknown

The Siege of Dvin happened in the summer of 927 when the Byzantine army besieged Dvin, which was under Sajid dynasty. The Byzantines were repelled with heavy losses.

== Background ==
After the end of the Byzantine–Bulgarian war of 913–927, the Byzantine emperor, Romanos I Lekapenos, began a recovery movement in the East under John Kourkouas. The Byzantines set their eyes on Armenia. Despite Armenia being allies with Byzantium, the Arabs continued their raids on Armenia. Therefore, it was important for Byzantium to protect this country against a complete takeover by the Arabs. The Armenian noble Gagik I Artsruni succeeded in securing Byzantine support against the Muslims. At that time, the Armenian king Ashot II of Armenia was at war with the Sajid dynasty. The Sajids used the city Dvin as their operation base against their enemies.

In 922, Divn was attacked by joint Byzantine-Armenian forces under Kourkouas, which was defended by Arab and Armenian troops. Dvin successfully withstood the attack. Dvin was governed by Nasr al-Subki, who took measurements to weaken the Armenian position by imprisoning Armenian magnates and taking repressive measures against Armenian monasteries and churches.

== Siege ==
In 927, a large Byzantine army under the command of John Kourkouas entered Armenia. The Byzantine army was excellently supplied with war materiel. They had with them mobile towers, ballistae, and a special kind of engine for projecting Greek fire, whose flames could engulf a dozen men at once and which was a powerful weapon used against the Muslims. The Byzantines managed to besiege the city. At the beginning of the fight, the Muslims managed to kill an important Byzantine officer who was in charge of operating the flame-throwing engines. This boosted their morale. John undertook the siege of Dvin and, having established himself on a height, followed the course of the battle while seated on a throne. Despite the firm resistance of the Muslims, the Byzantines succeeded in opening a passage to the walls of the city and, after making breaches in several places, entered inside.

As the Byzantines entered the city, their fortunes fell. The population of Dvin came to the aid of the troops, and all these forces together drove the Byzantines out of the city. Suffering heavy losses, the Byzantines left around 10,000 dead on the field. This event likely took place in the summer of 927.

== Aftermath ==
Despite the great victory, the rule of the Sajids came to an end in 929. Meanwhile, John Kourkouas went on a campaign to subdue Muslim forts in Southern Armenia. In 928, he captured an important fort of Ahlat.

== Sources ==
- Alexander Vasiliev (1968), Byzantium and the Arabs, Vol. 2: Political relations between Byzantines and Arabs during the Macedonian Dynasty (In French).
- Aram Ter-Ghewondyan (1976), The Arab Emirates in Bagratid Armenia.
- Steven Runciman (1988), The Emperor Romanus Lecapenus and his reign : a study of tenth-century Byzantium.
