= Dvin =

Dvin may refer to:

- Dvin (ancient city), an ancient city and one of the historic capitals of Armenia
- Dvin, Armenia, a modern village in Armenia named after the nearby ancient city of Dvin
- Verin Dvin, a village in the Ararat Province of Armenia
- FC Dvin Artashat, a dissolved Armenian football club from Artashat (1982–1999)
- Differentiated vulvar intraepithelial neoplasia (dVIN)
