= Melias =

10th-century Armenian prince and general

- Died: 934
- Military career
- Allegiance: Byzantine Empire
- Service years: c. 890–905, 907/8–934
- Rank: Strategos of Lykandos
- Wars: Arab–Byzantine wars in the East and Byzantine–Bulgarian wars

Melias (Greek: Μελίας) or Mleh (Armenian: Մլեհ, often Mleh-mec, "Mleh the Great" in Armenian sources) was an Armenian prince who entered Byzantine service and became a distinguished general, founding the theme of Lykandos and participating in the campaigns of John Kourkouas against the Arabs.

== Origin and early career ==
Melias was a member of the lower naxarar nobility, possibly from the Varazhnuni clan; he was possibly a grandson of Mliah, the prince of Varazhnunik, who was killed by the Arabs in 853. Melias first appears in historical sources as a vassal of Ashot the Long-armed, an Armenian prince (possibly a Bagratid from Taron) who entered Byzantine imperial service in circa 890. As part of Ashot's Armenian contingent, he fought on the Byzantine side at the disastrous Battle of Bulgarophygon against the Bulgarians. Ashot himself perished in this battle, along with the larger part of the Byzantine force.

Map of the Arab–Byzantine frontier zone, where Melias spent most of his life

Melias escaped death and returned to his service at the Byzantine eastern frontier, where, according to Constantine VII Porphyrogennetos, he led a group of fellow Armenians in the Byzantine border wars with the Arabs as akritai, sharing their time between raids against the Arabs and outright brigandage. After participating in the failed aristocratic rebellion of Andronikos Doukas against Emperor Leo VI the Wise (r. 886–912) in 905, however, Melias and many other Armenian nobles were forced to flee to the Arab border emirate of Melitene to escape retribution.

== Foundation of Lykandos ==
In 907 or 908, however, through the intervention of the strategos Eustathios Argyros, the Armenian refugees were pardoned by Emperor Leo and granted the border provinces as quasi-fiefs: the three brothers Vasak, Grigorik and Pazunes settled in the fortress of Larissa, which formed a border tourma of the theme of Sebasteia and now became a kleisoura (a fortified frontier district), Ismael (possibly an Arab-Armenian) took over the deserted area of Symposion, and Melias was appointed "tourmarches of Euphrateia, the Passes (Trypia, from Arabic al-Durub) and the wasteland", covering the mountainous frontier zone around the Pass of Hadath. Of these petty border-lords, Melias alone would hold his position for long: Ismael died in a Melitenian offensive in 909, while Vasak was accused of treason in 913, possibly due to his association with the failed usurpation of Constantine Doukas, and banished.

Melias soon occupied the old and deserted fortress of Lykandos, refortified it and made it his seat. Emperor Leo soon raised it and its surrounding region to a kleisoura. Settled by Armenian immigrants, for the next decades, it would be one of the main Byzantine bases of attack against the Arabs. In a similar manner, Melias proceeded to occupy the mountainous regions of Tzamandos and Symposion, which became a kleisoura and a tourma respectively. The threat that this new province and Melias's activities posed on the Arab emirates of the frontier zone (Thughur) is recognized in Arab sources, where Melias is mentioned as sahib al-Durub ("Lord of the Passes"). In 909 or 912, a major assault led by Rustam ibn Baradu was launched against him, but was repulsed. In 914/5, the Arabs of Tarsus launched an attack on Tzamandos, which they took and razed, but in retaliation Melias and his men raided Arab territory as far as Marash (Germanikeia, modern Kahramanmaraş), reportedly bringing back 50,000 captives.

In recognition for his success against Marash, in 916 the kleisoura of Lykandos was raised to the status of a full theme, with Melias as its strategos with the rank of patrikios and later magistros. In the next year, Melias and his troops took part in the campaign against Bulgaria that led to yet another disastrous defeat at Acheloos on 20 August 917.

Melias next reappears in the campaigns of John Kourkouas, where he played a prominent role. In 927, Kourkouas and Melias attacked Melitene, and succeeded in storming the city, although the citadel held out. As a result, Melitene pledged vassalage to the Byzantine Empire. In the event, Melitene soon renounced this treaty, and was placed again under siege by the Byzantines. According to an Arab account, Melias tried to infiltrate the city by disguising some of his troops as artisans, but the ploy was foiled. Nevertheless, the city soon after agreed to host a Byzantine garrison. In 930, Melias raided the territory near Samosata, but was defeated by the Arab general Nedjm, and one of his sons was captured and taken to Baghdad. He is last known to have participated in the opening stages of the campaign that led to the final capture of Melitene on 19 May 934, but neither Arab nor Byzantine sources mention him during or after this event, making it probable that he died at about this time.

Melias's descendants, however, continued to play an important role in Lykandos and in the Byzantine army: another Melias is recorded as serving with John Tzimiskes, both during the reign of Emperor Nikephoros II Phokas (r. 963–969) and during Tzimiskes's own reign (r. 969–976). It has also been suggested that the memory of Melias has been preserved in the figure of the apelates Melementzes in the acritic epic Digenes Akritas.

== Sources ==
- Dédéyan, Gérard (1993). "Les Arméniens sur la frontière sud-orientale de Byzance, fin IXe - fin XIe siècles". La Frontière. Séminaire de recherche (in French). Lyon: Maison de l'Orient et de la Méditerranée Jean Pouilloux. pp. 67–85. ISBN 2-903264-50-3.
- Foss, Clive (1991). "Lykandos". In Kazhdan, Alexander (ed.). The Oxford Dictionary of Byzantium. Oxford and New York: Oxford University Press. p. 1258. ISBN 0-19-504652-8.
- Guilland, Rodolphe (1957). "Les patrices byzantins sous le règne de Constantin VII Porphyrogénète (913–959)". Studi Bizantini e Neoellenici. 9. Rome: 188–221.
- Vasiliev, Alexander A.; Grégoire, Henri; Canard, Marius; Honigmann, Ernst [in German] (1935–1968). Byzance et les Arabes. Corpus Bruxellense Historiae Byzantinae (in French). Vol. 1–3 (in 4 volumes). Brussels: Institut de philologie et d'histoire orientales et slaves & Fondation Byzantine.
- Kazhdan, Alexander; Cutler, Antony (1991). "Melias". In Kazhdan, Alexander (ed.). The Oxford Dictionary of Byzantium. Oxford and New York: Oxford University Press. p. 1334. ISBN 0-19-504652-8.
- Runciman, Steven (1988) [1929]. The Emperor Romanus Lecapenus and His Reign: A Study of Tenth-Century Byzantium. Cambridge: Cambridge University Press. ISBN 0-521-35722-5.
- Treadgold, Warren (1997). A History of the Byzantine State and Society. Stanford, California: Stanford University Press. ISBN 0-8047-2630-2.
- Whittow, Mark (1996). The Making of Byzantium, 600–1025. Berkeley and Los Angeles, California: University of California Press. ISBN 978-0-520-20496-6.
