= Inger (senator) =

Byzantine soldier, politician and courtier

- Native name: Ἴγγηρ
- Born: c. 814
- Died: after 870
- Allegiance: Byzantine Empire
- Children: several, including Empress Eudokia Ingerina
- Other work: senator in Constantinople, courtier

Inger (Greek: Ἴγγηρ Μαρτινάκιος, romanized: Inger Martinakios; c. 814 - after 870) was a Byzantine soldier, politician and courtier.

== Life ==
Dimitri Obolensky, Romilly Jenkins and Cyril Mango noted that Inger's name is similar to Ingvar (Igor), which could've been an indication of his Scandinavian ancestry. However, Aleksey Shchavelyov disputes this assertion and instead considers Inger to be a descendant of the Phrygian Gothograeci. According to John Skylitzes, Inger was a member of the Martinakioi, a very noble Byzantine family. Christian Settipani speculates that Inger was a son of Anastasios, first known member of the Martinakioi and prominent supporter of iconoclasm. In Settipani's view, Inger's mother was a woman of Scandinavian origin, thus explaining his name.

Byzantine sources don't say much about Inger, although pro-Macedonian authors laud his nobility and good judgement. Their reluctance to discuss Inger's life was probably due to his connection with the iconoclasts.

In the service of Amorian emperors, Theophilos and Michael III, Inger rose to distinction in the military and ultimately became a senator in Constantinople. During the reign of Basil the Macedonian he served as a courtier before retiring to his estates and dying some time after 870.

Inger married and had several children, including the future empress Eudokia Ingerina.

== Sources ==
- Wortley, John, ed. (2010). John Skylitzes: A Synopsis of Byzantine History, 811–1057. Cambridge: Cambridge University Press. ISBN 978-0-521-76705-7.
- Щавелёв, Алексей (2012). "К этнической идентификации знатных византийцев по имени Ингер (конец VIII – начало IX в.)". Восточная Европа в древности и средневековье (in Russian). XXIV: 281–5.
- Mango, Cyril (1973). "Eudocia Ingerina, the Normans, and the Macedonian Dynasty". Zbornik Radova Vizantološkog Instituta. XIV–XV: 17–27.
- Settipani, Christian (2006). Continuité des élites à Byzance durant les siècles obscurs. Les princes caucasiens et l'Empire du VIe au IXe siècle Continuité des élites à Byzance durant les siècles obscurs (in French).
