= Eudokia Ingerina =

Byzantine empress from 866 to 882

- Augusta
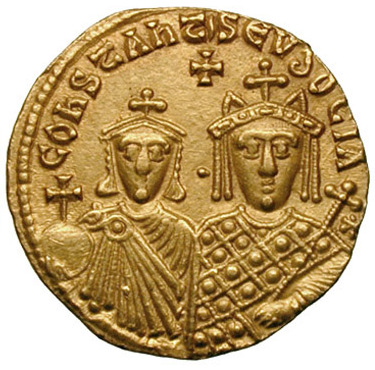
- Gold solidus of Eudokia and Constantine, Basil's firstborn son with first wife, Maria

Byzantine Empress consort
- Tenure: 26 May 866 – 882
- Born: c. 840
- Died: c. 882 (aged 41–42)
- Burial: Church of the Holy Apostles, Constantinople (now Istanbul, Turkey)
- Spouse: Michael III (as mistress); Basil I
- Issue more...: Leo VI the Wise; Stephen I of Constantinople; Alexander (Byzantine emperor)
- Dynasty: Macedonian
- Father: Inger
- Mother: Melissena Martinakia

Eudokia (or Eudocia) Ingerina (Greek: Ευδοκία Ιγγερίνα, romanized: Evdokia Ingerina; c. 840 – c. 882) was a Byzantine empress as the wife of the Byzantine emperor Basil I, the mistress of his predecessor Michael III, and the mother of emperors Leo VI and Alexander, as well as the mother of Patriarch Stephen I of Constantinople.

== Family ==
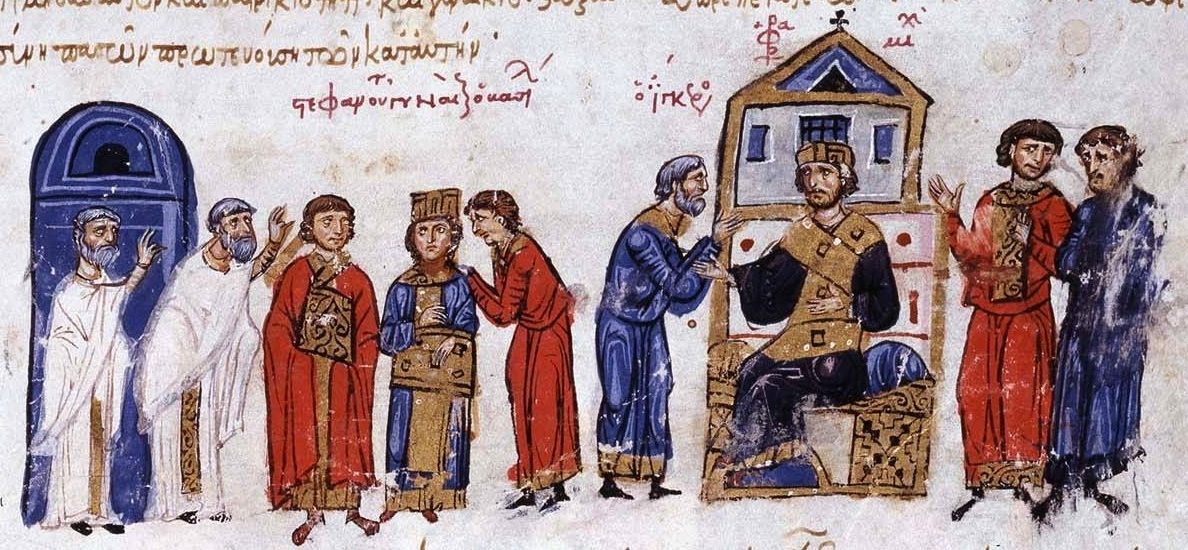
Eudokia's wedding, from the 12th-century Madrid Skylitzes

Eudokia was the daughter of Inger, who was probably a Varangian, while her mother Melissena was a member of a prominent Greek family, the Martinakoi, who were related to the Amorian dynasty, which ruled the Byzantine Empire from 820 to 867, and claimed imperial ancestry to Heraclius' sister and second mother-in-law. According to a later alternative reconstruction by Christian Settipani, her connection to the Martinakoi came through her father, whom he identifies as a Byzantine noble, Inger Martinakios, logothete. Eudokia is often referred to as 'half-Swedish', or more generally 'Scandinavian'.

== Life ==
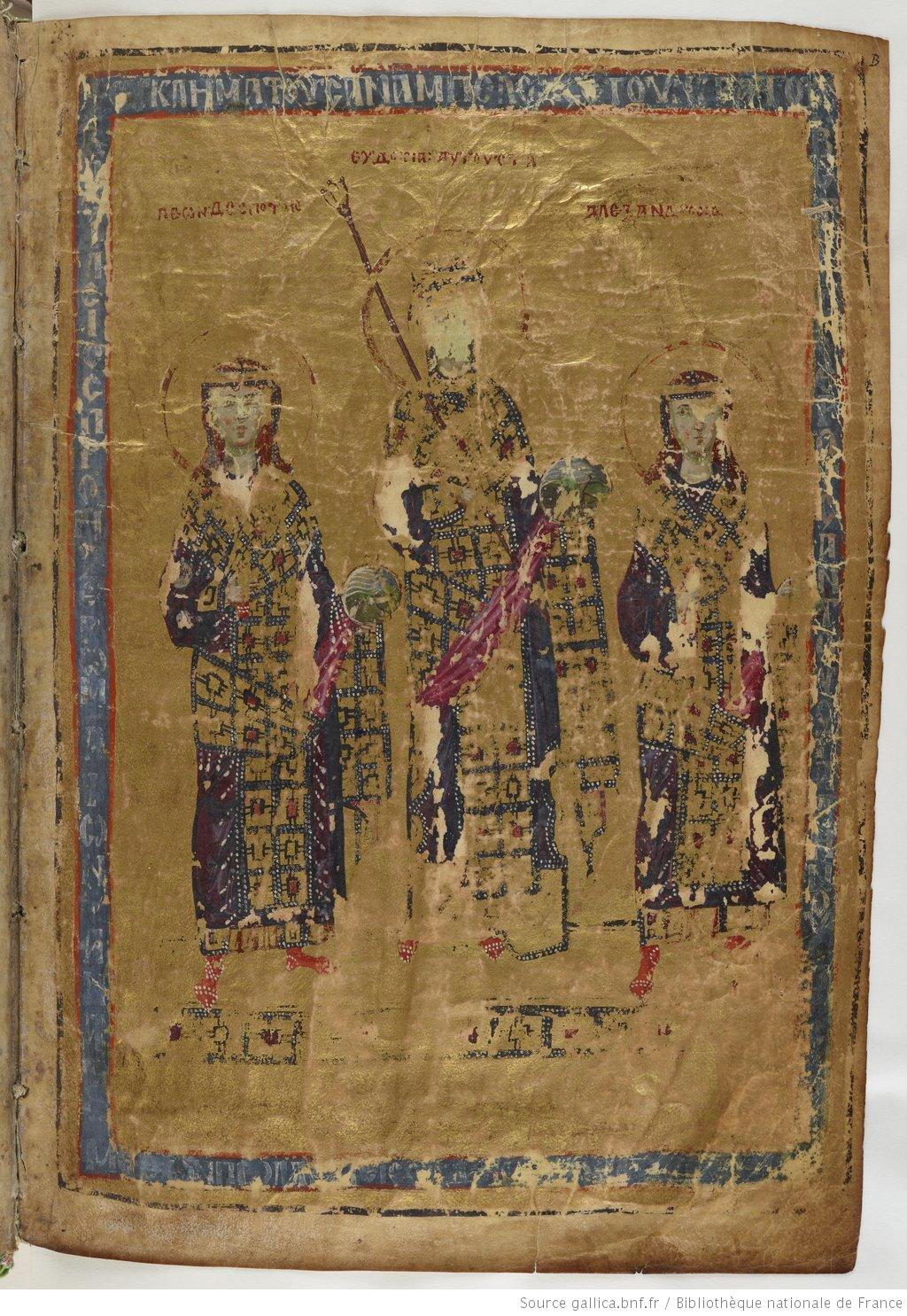
Eudokia alongside her sons Leo (left) and Alexander (right), from the Paris Gregory, AD 879–883.

Because her family was iconoclastic, the Empress Mother Theodora strongly disapproved of them. Around 855, Eudokia became the mistress of Theodora's son, Michael III, who thus incurred the anger of his mother and the powerful minister Theoktistos. Unable to risk a major scandal by leaving his wife, Michael married Eudokia to his friend Basil but continued his relationship with her. Basil was compensated with the emperor's sister Thekla as his own mistress.

Eudokia gave birth to a son, Leo, in September 866 and another, Stephen, in November 867. They were officially Basil's children, but this paternity was questioned, apparently even by Basil himself. The strange promotion of Basil to co-emperor in May 866 lends support to the great probability that at least Leo was actually Michael III's illegitimate son. The parentage of Eudokia's younger children is not a subject of dispute, as Michael III was murdered in September 867 by Basil I.

A decade into Basil's reign, Eudokia became involved with another man, whom the emperor ordered to be tonsured as monk. In 882, she selected Theophano as wife for her son Leo, and died shortly afterwards.

== Children ==
Eudokia and Basil officially had six children:

- Leo VI (19 September 866 – 11 May 912), who succeeded as emperor and is also considered by some to be the child of Michael III.
- Stephen I (November 867 – 18 May 893), patriarch of Constantinople, who according some scholars was also a son of Michael III.
- Alexander (c. 870 – 6 June 913), who succeeded as emperor in 912.
- Anna, Helen, and Maria (all d. 905/12 or after). Nuns in the convent of St Euphemia, Petron.

== Sources ==
- Hollingsworth, Paul A.; Culter, Anthony (1991). "Eudokia Ingerina". In Kazhdan, Alexander (ed.). Oxford Dictionary of Byzantium. p. 739. ISBN 978-0-19-504652-6.
- Cyril Mango, "Eudocia Ingerina, the Normans, and the Macedonian Dynasty," Zbornik Radova Vizantološkog Instituta, XIV-XV, 1973, 17–27.
- Lilie, Ralph-Johannes; Ludwig, Claudia; Zielke, Beate; Pratsch, Thomas, eds. (2013). "Eudokia (#1632)". Prosopographie der mittelbyzantinischen Zeit (in German). De Gruyter.
- Martindale, J.R. (2001). Eudokia 2. ISBN 978-1-897747-32-2.
- Treadgold, Warren (1988). The Byzantine Revival, 780–842. Stanford, California: Stanford University Press. pp. 283–287. ISBN 978-0-8047-1462-4.

== See also ==
- List of Byzantine emperors
- List of Roman and Byzantine empresses

Royal titles
Preceded by Eudokia Dekapolitissa	Byzantine Empress consort 866–882 with Eudokia Dekapolitissa (866–867)	Succeeded by Theophano Martinakia
