= Eudokia Dekapolitissa =

9th-century Byzantine empress

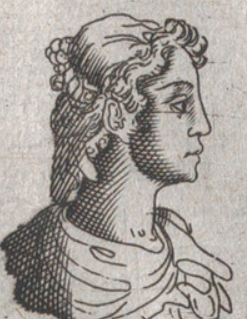
- Portrait from Speculum Romanae Magnificentiae (1575)

Empress of the Byzantine Empire
- Tenure: 855–867
- Born: c. 840
- Died: after 867
- Spouse: Michael III the Drunkard

Eudokia Dekapolitissa (Greek: Εὐδοκία ἡ Δεκαπολίτισσα, romanized: Evdokía Dekapolítissa; fl. 855–867) was the empress consort of Michael III (r. 842–867), the last member of the Phrygian Dynasty to rule the Byzantine Empire.

== Marriage ==
Michael III had succeeded to the throne in 842, when he was two years old. His mother, Theodora, and Theoktistos jointly served as his regents. In 855, Michael III was fifteen years old and had one mistress, Eudokia Ingerina.

Theodora did not approve of the relationship and organized a bride-show for her son, where Dekapolitissa was one of the contenders. Her background is unknown, though entry to a bride-show required noble origin and courtly connections, but her surname indicates an origin in the Isaurian Decapolis. Through the bride-show, Dekapolitissa was chosen to become empress.

== Empress ==
Throughout their marriage, Michael continued his affair with Ingerina. In early 856, Michael III relegated his surviving sisters to monasteries. On 15 March 856, Theodora was stripped of her title of Augusta. She was allowed to remain in the palace until accused of conspiring against her son the following year, when she was forced to join her daughters as a nun.

Although she remained Michael's legal wife, the status of Eudokia during these events is unknown. She continued to be the empress until the assassination of Michael III by Basil the Macedonian on 23–24 September 867. Eudokia was not harmed by Basil, and returned as a widow to her family. She does not resurface in historical records.

Royal titles
Preceded by Theodora	Byzantine Empress consort 855–867 with Eudokia Ingerina (866–867)	Succeeded by Eudokia Ingerina
