= Kainourgion =

The Kainourgion was a palantine hall built by Emperor Basil I from 867-886. Covered in mosaics to glorify the Macedonian dynasty, the Kainourgion depicted Basil's military victories and functioned as an imperial palace with audience chamber, a dining room, and connected bedrooms.

== Palantine hall ==
Built from 867-886, the Kainourgion is considered one of Basil's most important constructions, and contained a dome at the eastern end, with sixteen columns supporting the main hall. Above each column, the wall extending up to the dome was covered in mosaics. Each column, of which there were sixteen, was made of different materials and their surfaces consisted of different articulations. There were no galleries over the aisles since mosaics were depicted from ceiling to floor. The Kainourgion was built to function as an audience chamber and dining room for banquets, along with private bedrooms.

== Vita Basilii ==
The Vita Basilii, "life of Basil", is somewhat obscure as to the design of the Kainourgion, mentioning it only as the "New Building". It was located somewhere between the Marcian's Galleries and the Chrysotriklinos on a terrace approximately 11 meters above sea level.

The dome of the Kainourgion depicted military victories by Emperor Basil and his generals, while the ceiling of the bedchamber portrayed Basil as the new David. The floor mosaics of the bedchamber contained peacocks and eagles, while the wall mosaic illustrated the Emperor, Empress Eudocia and their children along with an inscription giving thanks to god. The entire bedchamber was a celebration of the Macedonian dynasty.

== De Cerimoniis ==
According to the De Ceremoniis, the empress's bedchamber lay in close proximity to the Kainourgion. Emperor Constantine VII stated, that one wall of the Kainourgion contained multicolored glass plaques, which were made to resemble shapes and colors of different flowers.

== Architecture ==
Ćurčić has noted architectural similarities between the Cappella Palatina and the Kainourgion, while Kostenec theorizes that the same can be said of the Margarites and the basilica of St. Nikos of Sparta. Called "one of the most magnificent buildings erected by Basil I", it was known for leaving spectators struck with amazement.

== Sources ==
- Alexander, Paul J. (1962). "The Strength of Empire and Capital as Seen through Byzantine Eyes". Speculum. 37, No. 3 July.
- Bowersock, Glen Warren; Brown, Peter; Grabar, Oleg, eds. (1999). Late Antiquity: A Guide to the Postclassical World. Harvard University Press.
- Connor, Carolyn L. (2016). Saints and spectacle : Byzantine mosaics in their cultural setting. Oxford University Press.
- Ćurčić, Slobodan (1987). "Some Palatine Aspects of the Cappella Palatina in Palermo". Dumbarton Oaks Papers. 41. doi:10.2307/1291551. JSTOR 1291551.
- Kostenec, J. (2004). "The Heart of the Empire: The Great Palace of the Byzantine Emperors Reconsidered". In Dark, Ken R. (ed.). Secular Buildings and the Archaeology of Everyday Life in the Byzantine Empire. Oxbow Publishing.
- Talbot, Alice-Mary (2005). "Evidence about Byzantine Glass in Medieval Greek Texts from the Eighth to the Fifteenth Century". Dumbarton Oaks Papers. 59. doi:10.2307/4128753. JSTOR 4128753.
- Tougher, Shaun (1997). The Reign of Leo VI (886-912): Politics and People. Brill.
