= Antony II of Constantinople =

Ecumenical Patriarch of Constantinople from 893 to 901

- Ecumenical Patriarch of Constantinople
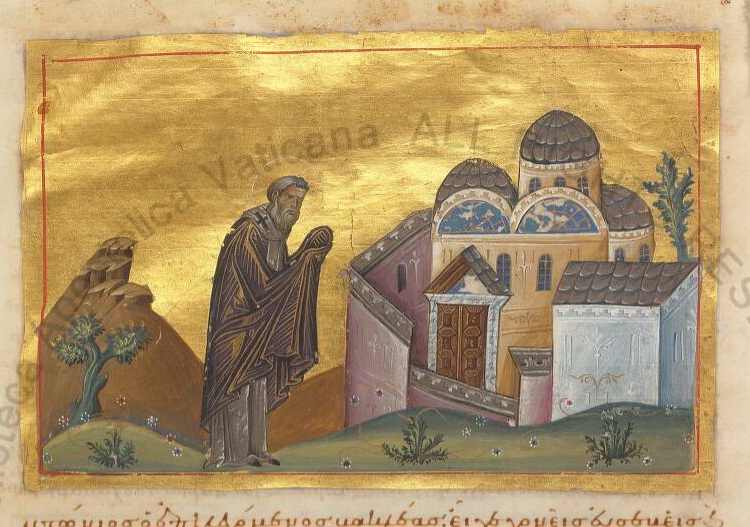
- Installed: August 893
- Term ended: 12 February 901
- Predecessor: Stephen I of Constantinople
- Successor: Nicholas I of Constantinople

Personal details
- Born: Antony Kauleas
- Died: 12 February 901
- Denomination: Chalcedonian Christianity

Antony II Kauleas (Greek: Ἀντώνιος Καυλέας, romanized: Antōnios Kauleas; died 12 February 901) was Ecumenical Patriarch of Constantinople from August 893 to 12 February 901.

== Life ==
A monk by age 12, Antony Kauleas became a priest and the abbot of an unnamed monastery. He came to the attention of Stylianos Zaoutzes, the all-powerful minister of Emperor Leo VI the Wise. Antony had supported Leo VI against the former Patriarch Photius I and had contributed to the pacification of the Church by effecting a compromise between the supporters of Photius I and Patriarch Ignatius. The emperor appointed Antony patriarch after the death of his own brother, Patriarch Stephen I of Constantinople in 893.

Patriarch Antony II was a pious man who generously endowed monastic foundations and founded or re-founded the Kaulea monastery with the support of the emperor, who preached at the church's dedication. Buried in the church of his monastery, Antony was held responsible for various miracles. He was canonized as a saint by both the Orthodox and Catholic Churches and he is commemorated on 12 February.

== See also ==
- Eastern Orthodoxy

== Bibliography ==
- Cutler, Anthony; Talbot, Alice-Mary (1991). "Antony II Kauleas". In Kazhdan, Alexander (ed.). Oxford Dictionary of Byzantium. p. 125. ISBN 978-0-19-504652-6.

Titles of Chalcedonian Christianity
Preceded by Stephen I	Ecumenical Patriarch of Constantinople; 893 – 901	Succeeded by Nicholas I
