= Basiliskianos =

Basiliskianos (Ancient Greek: Βασιλισκιανός), also Basiliskos (Βασιλίσκος) or Basilikinos (Βασιλικῖνος), was a Byzantine courtier and companion of emperor Michael III.

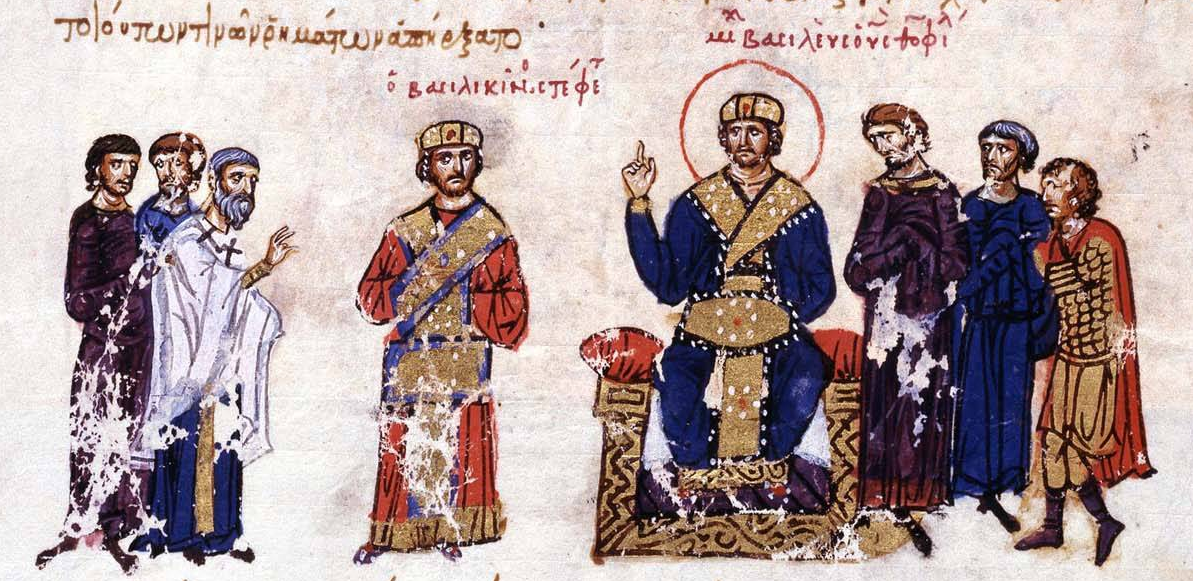
Emperor Michael III and "Basilikinos" in imperial garb, from the Madrid Skylitzes

Very little is known about his origin and early life. John Skylitzes and Theophanes Continuatus (as well as Zonaras, who follows them) report that he was originally a simple rower in one of the emperor's personal ships, but this may well be later fabrication to disparage him. Theophanes Constinuatus also reports that he was the brother of Constantine Kapnogenes, who later became urban prefect. By 866, Basiliskianos had risen to the rank of patrikios, and was serving in the imperial household (koiton), being one of Emperor Michael III's close companions. On 1 September of that year, after a chariot race at the palace of Saint Mamas (in modern Beşiktaş), Basiliskianos congratulated the emperor so fulsomely on his victory that, according to the chroniclers, the delighted Michael ordered him to take from his own feet the red imperial boots (tzangia) and put them on himself. This provoked the displeasure of Michael's co-emperor Basil the Macedonian, a man of humble origin who had risen to power through his own close relationship with Michael. Michael, seeing Basil's disapproval, became angry, and threatened to make Basiliskianos co-emperor in Basil's place.

The rift between Michael and his erstwhile protégé widened thereafter, and on 24 September 867, when Michael retired drunk to his quarters at Saint Mamas, Basil and eight of his supporters moved to kill the emperor. The protovestiarios Rendakios, who normally slept before the emperor's bedroom, was absent, and Basiliskianos took his place on that night. When Basil and his co-conspirators barged into the bedchamber, Basiliskianos tried to oppose them but was wounded and thrown aside. After the conspirators killed Michael, they rowed down the Bosporus back to Constantinople, where Basil was hastily crowned sole emperor, inaugurating the Macedonian dynasty. Nothing further is known of Basiliskianos after that.

== Sources ==
- Bury, J. B. (1912). History of the Eastern Roman Empire from the Fall of Irene to the Accession of Basil: A.D. 802–867. London: Macmillan & Co.
- Lilie, Ralph-Johannes; Ludwig, Claudia; Pratsch, Thomas; Zielke, Beate (1999). "977. Basiliskianos". Prosopographie der mittelbyzantinischen Zeit: 1. Abteilung (641–867), Band 1: Aaron (# 1) – Georgios (# 2182) (in German). Berlin and Boston: De Gruyter. p. 319. ISBN 978-3-11-015179-4.
