= Stephen I of Constantinople =

Ecumenical Patriarch of Constantinople from 886 to 893

- Ecumenical Patriarch of Constantinople
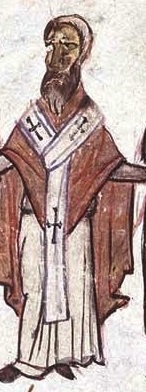
- Stephen I as depicted in the 12th century Madrid Skylitzes
- Installed: 18 December 886
- Term ended: 18 May 893
- Predecessor: Photios I of Constantinople
- Successor: Antony II of Constantinople

Personal details
- Born: November 867 Constantinople
- Died: 18 May 893
- Denomination: Chalcedonian Christianity
- Parents: Eudokia Ingerina; Basil I (official) or Michael III (possibly biologically)

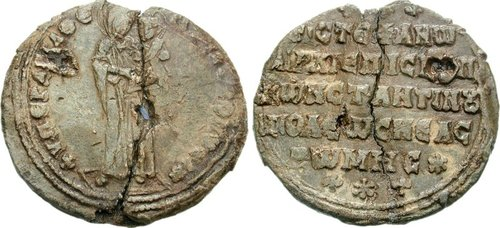
Lead seal of "Stephen, Archbishop of Constantinople New Rome", either of Stephen I or of Stephen II

Stephen I of Constantinople (Greek: Στέφανος, Stéphanos; November 867 – 18 May 893), called the Macedonian (Greek: ὁ Μακεδών, romanized: ō Makedṓn), was the Ecumenical Patriarch of Constantinople from 886 to 893.

Born at Constantinople, Stephen was the son of Eudokia Ingerina and, officially, Emperor Basil I. However, at the time when he was conceived, Eudokia was the mistress of Emperor Michael III. Consequently, it is probable that like his older brother Leo VI the Wise, Stephen was Michael's son.

Castrated by Basil I, Stephen became a monk and was designated for a career in the church since his childhood. In 886, his brother, the new Emperor Leo VI, dismissed Patriarch Photios I and appointed the 19-year-old Stephen in his stead.

As patriarch, Stephen I participated in the ceremonial reburial of Michael III by Leo VI in the imperial mausoleum attached to the Church of the Holy Apostles in Constantinople. He acquired a reputation for piety, and died in May 893 at the age of 25. His feast day in the Eastern Orthodox Church is on 18 May.

== Bibliography ==
- Kazhdan, Alexander, ed. (1991). The Oxford Dictionary of Byzantium. Oxford and New York: Oxford University Press. ISBN 0-19-504652-8.

Titles of Chalcedonian Christianity
Preceded by Photius I	Ecumenical Patriarch of Constantinople; 886 - 893	Succeeded by Antony II
