= Battle of Mauropotamos =

844 battle of the Arab-Byzantine Wars

- Part of the Arab–Byzantine wars
- Map of Byzantine Asia Minor and the Byzantine-Arab frontier region ca. 842
Date	844
Location	Mauropotamos, Asia Minor
Result	Abbasid victory

Belligerents
Abbasid Caliphate; Emirate of Melitene	Byzantine Empire

Commanders and leaders
Abu Sa'id Muhammad b Yusuf; Umar al-Aqta	Theoktistos

The Battle of Mauropotamos (Greek: Μάχη τοῦ Μαυροποτάμου) was fought in 844, between the armies of the Byzantine Empire and the Abbasid Caliphate, at Mauropotamos (either in northern Bithynia or in Cappadocia). After a failed Byzantine attempt to recover the Emirate of Crete in the previous year, the Abbasids launched a raid into Asia Minor. The Byzantine regent, Theoktistos, headed the army that went to meet the invasion but was heavily defeated, and many of his officers defected to the Arabs. Internal unrest prevented the Abbasids from exploiting their victory, however. A truce and a prisoner exchange were consequently agreed in 845, followed by a six-year cessation of hostilities, as both powers focused their attention elsewhere.

== Background ==
Following the restoration of the veneration of icons in March 843, the Byzantine Empire's government, headed by the Empress-regent Theodora and the logothetes Theoktistos, embarked on a sustained assault on the Byzantines' main political and ideological foe, the Abbasid Caliphate and its dependencies. This aggressive stance was on the one hand facilitated by the internal stability that the end of the Iconoclasm controversy brought, and on the other encouraged by a desire to vindicate the new policy through military victories against the Muslims.

The first such campaign, an attempted reconquest of the Emirate of Crete led by Theoktistos in person, made initial gains, but ultimately ended in disaster. After scoring a victory over the Arabs in Crete, Theoktistos learned of a rumour that Theodora intended to name a new emperor, possibly her brother Bardas. Theoktistos hurried back to Constantinople, where he discovered that the rumour was false, but in his absence, the Byzantine army in Crete was routed by the Arabs.

== Battle ==
In 844, according to Byzantine sources, Theoktistos learned of an Arab invasion of Byzantine Asia Minor, led by a certain 'Amr, probably the semi-autonomous emir of Malatya, Umar al-Aqta. The Arab sources do not make explicit mention of this campaign. The Russian scholar Alexander Vasiliev, however, identified it with an expedition recorded in the poems of Abu Tammam and Buhturi, which was led by general Abu Sa'id and took place during the regency of Theodora. Umar al-Aqta's participation is likely, as he often aided the Abbasids in their raids against the Byzantines. According to Arab accounts, the troops led by Abu Sa'id comprised men from the border emirates of Qaliqala (Theodosiopolis) and Tarsus. The Arab forces united at Ardandun (possibly the border fort of Rhodandos) before raiding through the Byzantine themes of Cappadocia, Anatolikon, Boukellarion, and Opsikion. Sa'id's troops sacked Dorylaion and even reached the shore of the Bosporus.

Theoktistos led the Byzantine army against the invaders, but was heavily defeated at Mauropotamos ("Black River"). The location of the latter, if indeed it is a river and not a simple toponym, is disputed; it was most likely a tributary of the Sangarius in Bithynia or of the Halys in Cappadocia. Not only did the Byzantines suffer heavy casualties, but many senior Byzantine officials defected to the Arabs. Theoktistos returned to Constantinople, where he blamed Bardas for the recent defeats and had him exiled from the capital.

== Aftermath ==
The Abbasids were unable to exploit their success due to the internal instability of the Caliphate. Likewise, the Byzantines preferred to focus their strength against the ongoing conquest of Sicily by the Aghlabids. Thus, a Byzantine embassy was sent to Baghdad in 845, which was warmly received. The Abbasids reciprocated with an embassy to Constantinople, where the two states agreed on a truce and a prisoner exchange, which was held at the River Lamos on 16 September 845. A winter raid by the Arab governor of Tarsus shortly after failed disastrously, after which the Arab-Byzantine frontier remained quiet for six years.

== Sources ==
- Kiapidou, Irini-Sofia (14 March 2003). "Battle of Mavropotamos, 844". Encyclopedia of the Hellenic World, Asia Minor. Athens: Foundation of the Hellenic World. Archived from the original on 11 June 2012.
- Treadgold, Warren (1997). A History of the Byzantine State and Society. Stanford, California: Stanford University Press. ISBN 0-8047-2630-2.
- Vasiliev, Alexander A. (1935). Byzance et les Arabes, Tome I: La dynastie d'Amorium (820–867). Corpus Bruxellense Historiae Byzantinae (in French). Vol. 1. French ed.: Henri Grégoire, Marius Canard. Brussels: Éditions de l'Institut de philologie et d'histoire orientales.
