= Paris Gregory =

Illuminated manuscript of the Homilies of Gregory of Nazianzus

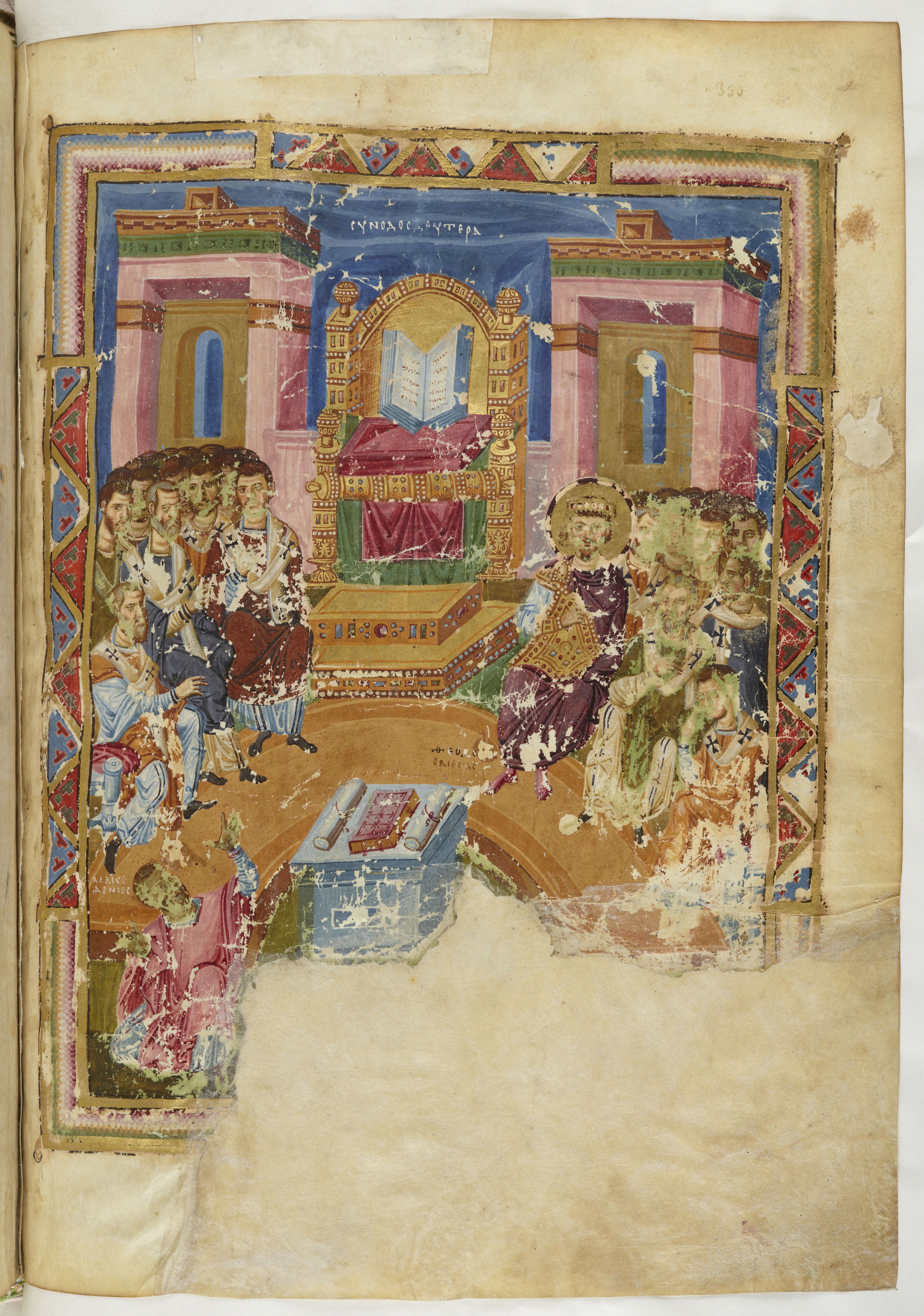
Illustration of the First Council of Constantinople

The Paris Gregory (BnF Grec 510) is an illuminated manuscript of the Homilies of Gregory of Nazianzus commissioned in Constantinople by Patriarch Photios I as a commemoration to the Emperor Basil I between 879 and 883. The illustrations from the manuscript are held today in the Bibliothèque nationale de France in Paris as part of their collection of Greek manuscripts.

== Origin ==
The Homilies of Gregory was commissioned as a gift for emperor Basil I by the Patriarch of Constantinople Photios I, to both celebrate the triumph of Orthodoxy and to praise the reign of Basil I. The focus on St. Gregory, a fourth-century archbishop of Constantinople, is a very deliberate decision made by Photios, who, being a highly educated man was well aware of the connotation of wisdom and devout faith that would be drawn by having a commemorative piece made focusing on the famous homilies delivered by St. Gregory in Nazianzus. Some have speculated as to the reason for devoting a manuscript to an emperor who was most likely illiterate, but the formality of the gesture, and intricate design of the work lend weight to the idea that this was done as a celebratory gift, and not something Basil I would have actually have been expected to read. However, the high quality of this manuscript does also suggest that it was in fact meant to be enjoyed by patriarchal circles who could read it, and not just the emperor.

== Overview ==
The Homilies are considered by many art historians to be one of the best preserved and most carefully designed Byzantine manuscripts to survive the period immediately following Iconoclasm. Created as a celebration of the triumph of Orthodoxy over Iconoclasm, this manuscript's elaborate design and level of sophistication strongly suggests that it was designed and created in Constantinople by professional artists. Though the text itself is actually a series of homilies delivered by Gregory from the fourth century, many of the illustrations bordering the text have nothing to do directly with sermons themselves, and actually serve as contextual backdrop orchestrated by Photios, to draw parallels between the fall of Iconoclasm and the enduring faith of Greek Orthodoxy. For instance, the council of 381 is illustrated several times throughout the condemnation of the Arian heretics, despite the fact that St. Gregory was never present at that particular meeting. Important segments of text meant to be read carefully are punctuated with large golden symbols, and the paintings throughout are done using colorful tempera. There are also images depicting the raising of Lazarus, the burning bush, Moses and even Gregory with his father in Nanzianzus. These paintings are all done in the quintessential mid-Byzantine style with elongated and stylized proportions on the figures, and heavy symbolism used throughout. This obscure style lends to the idea that Photios was communicating on a level of subtext rather than just completely derivative interpretation.

== Background ==
Though the focus of the manuscript is on the homilies delivered by St. Gregory, the political message being delivered is much more open to interpretation. The parallel between the Arian and Macedonian heresy being carried out in the fourth century, and the tensions rising between the Latin and Orthodox interpretations of the Holy Spirit at the time the manuscript was created is apparent from the offset. Photios was virulently opposed to the Latin interpretation of divinity and was trying to cement the tried and tested wisdom of Eastern Orthodoxy by using the sermons of Gregory, a fellow patriarch who stood defiantly against the rule of Julian, a non-Christian emperor of the fourth century. St. Gregory, who was often depicted with a spade-shaped beard and grey hair, was depicted to be a remarkably wise and patient man by his predecessors. Using him as the source material to celebrate Basil I was a way of drawing a correlation between conventional wisdom, and a new emperor who was considered by many to be a true successor to Justinian.
