= Michael III =

Byzantine emperor from 842 to 867

- Emperor and Autocrat of the Romans
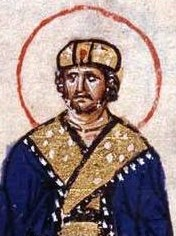
- Michael III as depicted in the 12th century Madrid Skylitzes

Byzantine emperor
- Reign: 20 January 842 – 24 September 867
- Coronation: 16 May 840 (as co-emperor)
- Predecessor: Theophilos
- Successor: Basil I
- Co-rulers: See list: Theophilos (840–42, emperor); Theodora (842–56, regent); Thekla (842–56, co-empress); Bardas (862–866, caesar); Basil I (866–67, co-emperor)
- Born: 9/10 January 840; Constantinople, Byzantine Empire
- Died: 24 September 867 (aged 27); Constantinople, Byzantine Empire
- Spouse: Eudokia Dekapolitissa
- Issue: Leo VI (paternity uncertain); Stephen I of Constantinople (paternity uncertain)
- Dynasty: Amorian
- Father: Theophilos
- Mother: Theodora
- Religion: Chalcedonian Christianity

Michael III (Ancient Greek: Μιχαήλ, romanized: Michaḗl; 9/10 January 840 – 24 September 867), also known as Michael the Drunkard, was Byzantine emperor from 842 to 867. Michael III was the third and traditionally last member of the Amorian (or Phrygian) dynasty. He was given the disparaging epithet the Drunkard (ὁ Μέθυσος) by the hostile historians of the succeeding Macedonian dynasty, but modern historical research has rehabilitated his reputation to some extent, demonstrating the vital role his reign played in the resurgence of Byzantine power in the 9th century. He was also the youngest person to bear the imperial title (aged 4-8 months), as well as the youngest to succeed as senior emperor (aged 2) in the Roman Empire. In 867, Michael was assassinated by his successor, Basil I.

== Life ==
=== Early life and regency ===
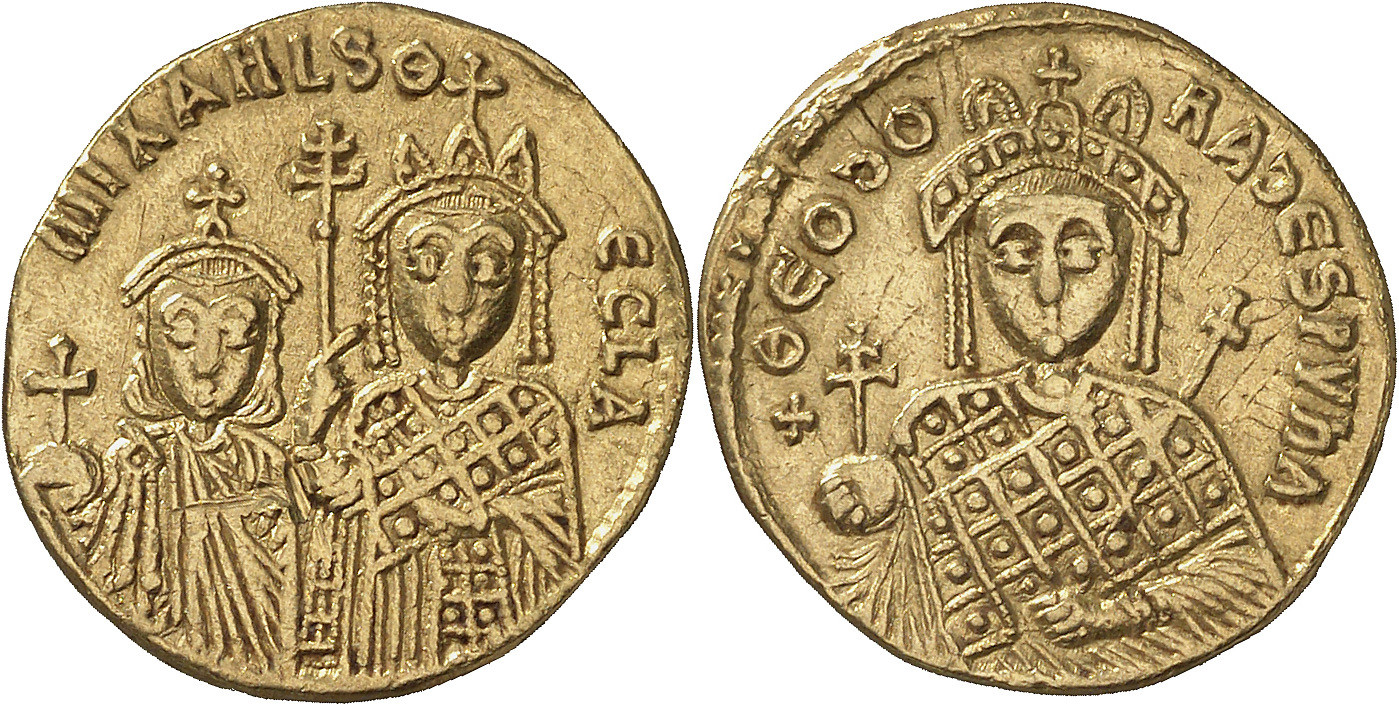
Solidus of empress Theodora with Thekla and Michael III. (Note: This coin struck during the regency of Theodora shows how Michael was less prominent than his mother, who is represented as sole ruler on the obverse, and even less than his sister Thekla, who is depicted together with the young Michael on the reverse.)

Michael was the youngest child of the emperor Theophilos and his empress Theodora. His precise date of birth is uncertain, but the balance of available evidence supports a birthdate in early 840, probably on 9 or 10 January. He was crowned co-emperor soon after, probably on 16 May of the same year. (Note: Patriarch Photius I notes that Michael was emperor "from the very cradle", that is, emperor since birth. Given that the coronation of a junior emperor almost always took place on a holiday, and Whitsunday is the closest event to Michael's birth, historians often place the coronation on 16 May. For comparison, Staurakios and Michael I's children were crowned on Christmas (25 December); Constantine VI on Holy Saturday (14 April); Leo IV on Whitsunday (6 June); and Constantine V on Easter Sunday (31 March).) (Note: "Theophilos crowned Michael, his son, in the Great Church and, as the custom was, he gave gifts to everyone at the coronation" (Symeon Logothete, 130, 41). Coins featuring Michael and Theophilos address him as despotes.) Michael had just turned two years old when his father died, and Michael succeeded him as sole emperor on 20 January 842.

During Michael's minority, the empire was governed by a regency headed by his mother Theodora, her uncle Sergios, and the eunuch Theoktistos, who was Postal Logothete and the most powerful of the three. Within a year the regents had begun to carefully plan a program of restoring iconophile orthodoxy. Stories of Theodora's secret devotion to images during Theophilos' reign are dubious and she was likely motivated not only by religious but also political and pragmatic concerns. Theoktistos had been an enthusiastic supporter of Theophilos and so was clearly motivated by pragmatism in endorsing the later iconophile program. Yet there was little opposition other than from John VII and the clergy of the Hagia Sophia. The future Patriarch Methodios I held a synod in the Palace of Blachernae rather than in the patriarchal church, which suggests that they resisted the changes. However in March, the Acts of the Second Council of Nicaea (787) were reaffirmed and the leading iconoclasts of the Council of Constantinople of 815 declared to be heretics. Theophilos was not mentioned in order to not alienate the ruling imperial family and its supporters. Theodora had also explicitly demanded that her husband not be dishonoured. Patriarch John VII of Constantinople was then asked to resign, and replaced him with the iconophile Methodios, who, despite his iconophilism, was a close associate of Theophilos. The occasion was marked with a solemn procession on the first Sunday of Lent (11 March 843), from Blachernae to the Hagia Sophia, followed by a liturgy in the church. These events came to be known as the "Triumph of Orthodoxy". Methodios carried out an expulsion of iconoclast clergy and was later accused of fomenting dissension within the church. The sources, which are sympathetic to iconophilism, do not report much dissent among the clergy or general population, which suggests a general passivity or neutrality on the issue. With these events the second spell of Byzantine iconoclasm was put to an end, and the autonomy of the Church was affirmed against imperial power.

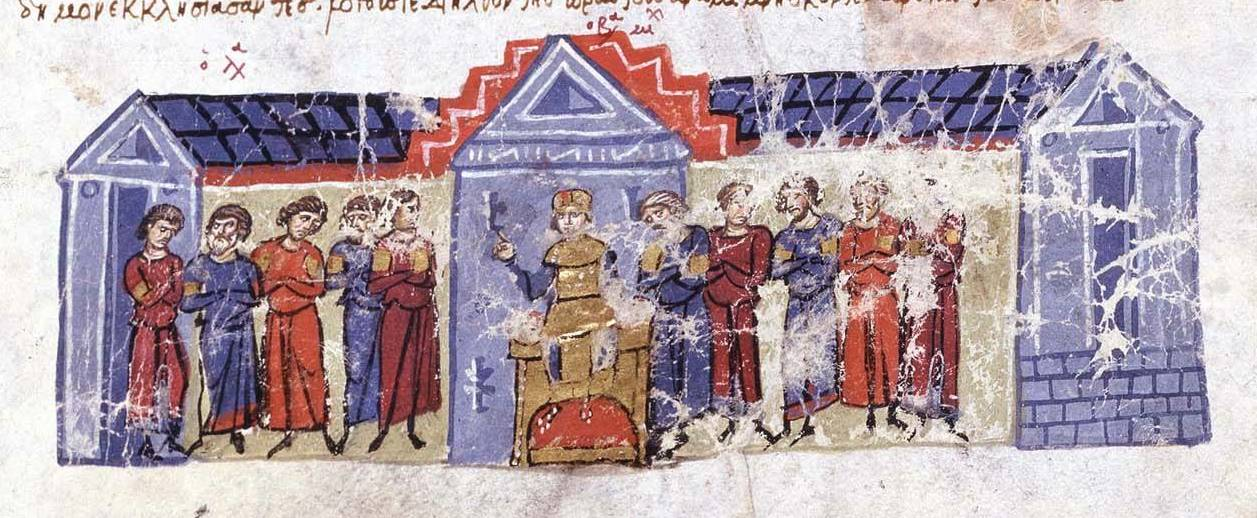
Coronation of the young Michael III, miniature from the Madrid Skylitzes, 12th century

As the emperor was growing up, the courtiers around him fought for influence. Theoktistos disliked Michael's uncle Bardas, and excluded him from court politics. When Theodora and Theoktistos arranged the marriage of Eudokia Dekapolitissa to Michael, who preferred Eudokia Ingerina, Bardas won his nephew's favour by persuading him to allow a plot to murder Theoktistos. In 855, the regency was overthrown when Theoktistos was murdered in the Great Palace of Constantinople, and in 857, Theodora was barred from government and relegated along with her daughters to a monastery in 857.

=== Warfare and foreign policy ===
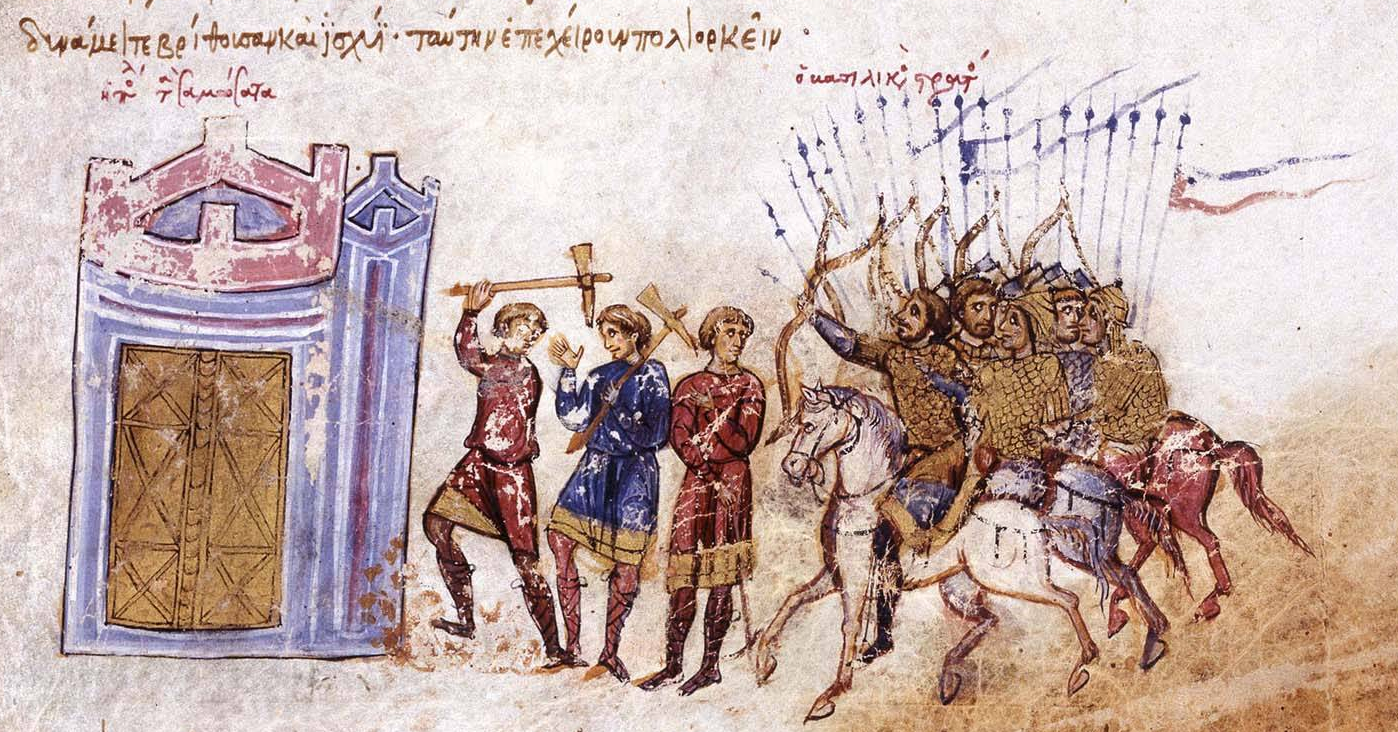
The Byzantine army led by Michael III lays siege to Samosata.

The internal stabilisation of the state was not entirely matched along the frontiers. Although the Abbasid Caliphate was no longer launching major invasions, and raids were led by local amirs along the frontier rather than the Caliph himself, Byzantine forces were defeated by the Abbasids in Pamphylia, Crete, and on the border with Syria, but a Byzantine fleet of 85 ships did score a victory over the Arabs in 853. There were also many operations around the Aegean and off the Syrian coast by at least three more fleets, numbering 300 ships total. The Byzantines were able to successfully assault Damietta in Egypt in 853. In the 820s, Andalusian Arab pirates seized Crete, which Theoktistos attempted to regain in the first year of the regency, though unsuccessfully. Bardas was planning to sail there but was murdered on the instigation of Basil in 866. The recapture was not achieved until 961, long after Michael's reign.

A conflict between the Byzantines and the First Bulgarian Empire occurred during 855 and 856. The Byzantine Empire wanted to regain its control over some areas of Thrace, including Philippopolis and the ports around the Gulf of Burgas on the Black Sea. Byzantine forces, led by the emperor and the caesar Bardas, were successful in reconquering a number of cities – Philippopolis, Develtus, Anchialus and Mesembria among them – as well as the region of Zagora. At the time of this campaign the Bulgarians were distracted by a war with the Franks under Louis the German and the Croatians. In 853, Khan Boris I of Bulgaria had allied himself to Duke Rastislav of Moravia against the Franks. The Bulgarians were heavily defeated by the Franks; following this, the Moravians changed sides and the Bulgarians then faced threats from Moravia.

Following an expedition led by Michael's uncle and general, Petronas, against the Paulicians from the eastern frontier and the Arab borderlands in 856, the imperial government resettled them in Thrace, thus cutting them off from their coreligionists and populating another border region. The Paulicians, whose power centre was Tephrike, were heavily persecuted after the restoration of icons as they were deemed unorthodox. It was only in 872 that Christopher, Domestic of the Schools, defeated their leader Chrysocheir, and Tephrike was taken in 878. Michael was also responsible, as per the writings of Constantine VII, for the subjugation of the Slavs settled in the Peloponnese.

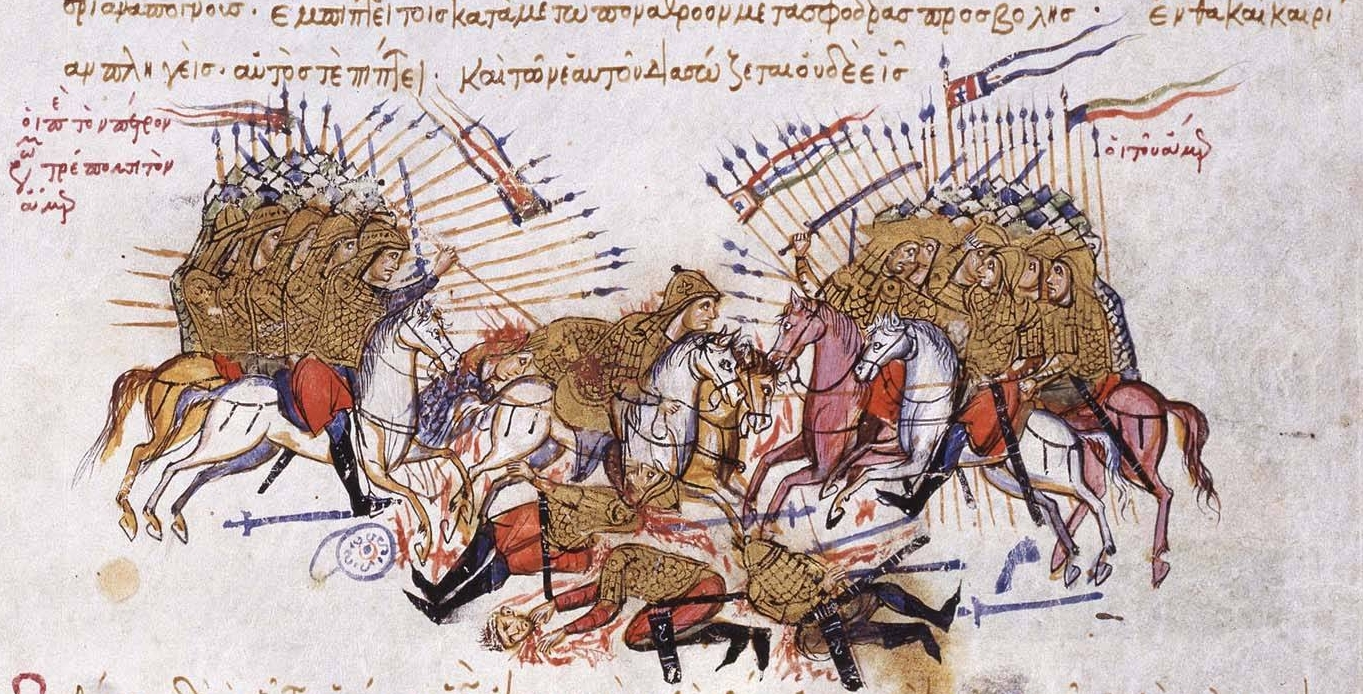
The Byzantine and Arab armies clash at the Battle of Lalakaon

Michael took an active part in the wars against the Abbasids and their vassals on the eastern frontier from 856 to 863, and particularly in 857 when he sent an army of 50,000 men against Emir Umar al-Aqta of Melitene. In 859, he personally led a siege on Samosata, but in 860 had to abandon the expedition to repel a naval attack by the Rus' on Constantinople. The Rus' fleet plundered the outer suburbs of the city but left of their own volition, probably because they had acquired sufficient booty. The subsequent relationship with the Rus' was mixed; they requested a Byzantine mission which was short-lived, and engaged in further raids but also trade in the tenth century. It was only in the late tenth century that the Christianisation of the Rus' was achieved by Grand Prince Vladimir of Kiev.

Soon after the raid, Duke Rastislav requested a Byzantine mission, perhaps to secure a political counterweight to his neighbours; the Franks and the Bulgars. In 863, they sent Cyril and Methodius, who were from Thessalonika. They developed the first Slavic alphabet, the Glagolitic alphabet, and translated many religious texts into this new literary language. Their mission ceased when Rastislav died and other Slavic princes as well as the Franks pressured them. Nevertheless Cyril, Methodius and their disciples were influential in the newly Christian Bulgaria, where they were exiled to from Moravia in 885. They were installed at Ohrid and Pliska, where they were charged with the creation of a Slavic clergy and the expounding of Christianity in the Slavic vernacular, although Greek remained the liturgical and ceremonial language.

In 863, Petronas defeated and killed the emir of Melitene at the Battle of Lalakaon, and celebrated a triumph in the capital. The year 863 is seen as a turning point in the Arab-Byzantine wars, after which the Byzantines began to go on the offensive, leading to their triumph in the tenth century.

Within the decentralising Abbasid Caliphate, the Armenians, who were vassals of the Abbasids, even participating in the Sack of Amorion of 838, gained a degree of independence. Ashot I of Armenia was crowned king of Armenia in 884, and recognised by Michael and Basil as "prince of princes". Friendly relations between Byzantium and Armenia continued into the tenth century, to the benefit of Byzantine eastward expansion.

=== Photian schism and Christianisation of Bulgaria ===
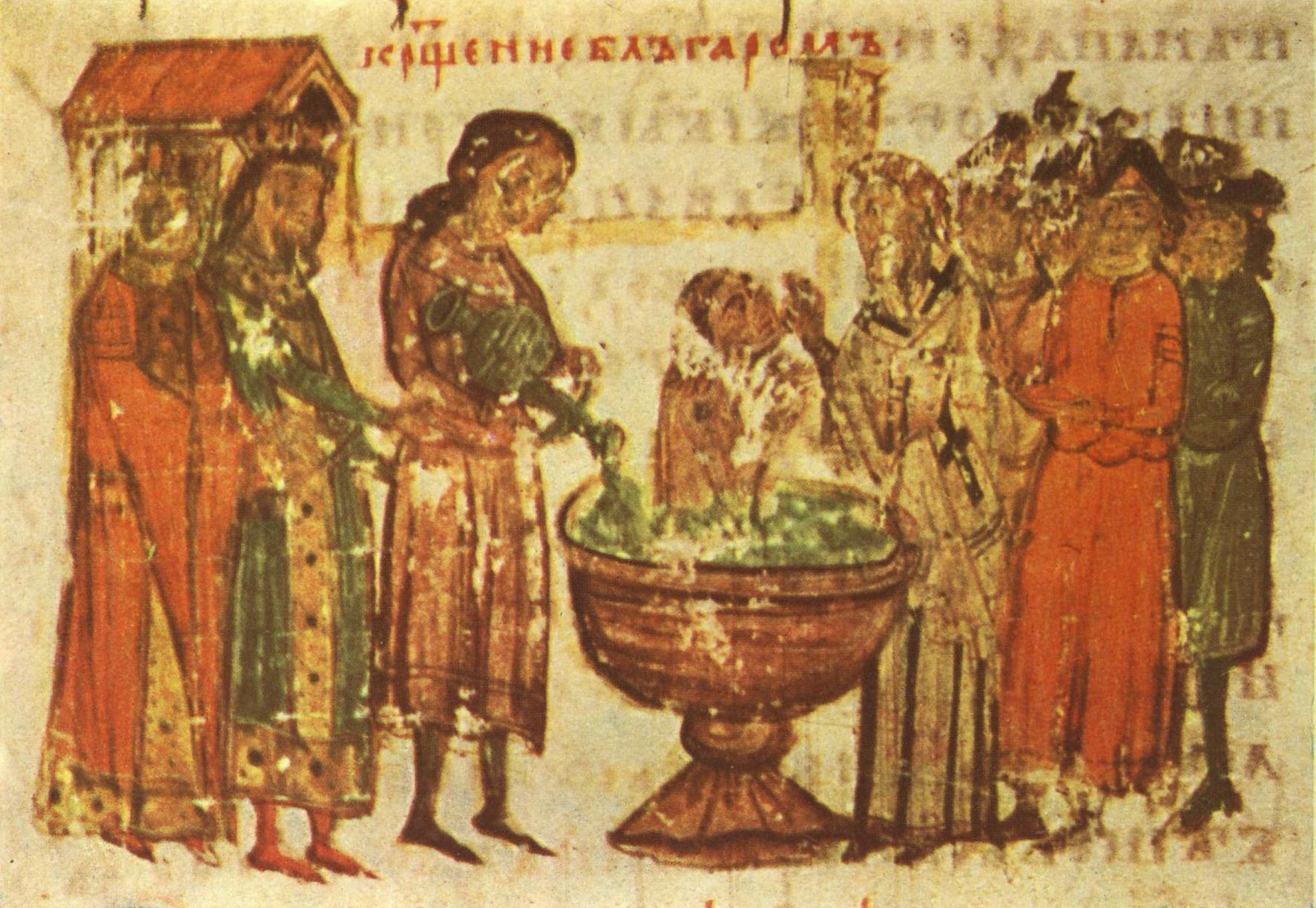
The baptism of Boris I of Bulgaria

Bardas justified his usurpation of the regency by introducing various internal reforms. Under the influence of both Bardas and Photios, Michael presided over the reconstruction of ruined cities and structures, the reopening of closed monasteries, and the fostering of intellectual life in the form of the reorganisation of the imperial university at the Maganaura palace under Leo the Mathematician.

Photios, originally a layman, had entered holy orders and was promoted to the position of patriarch on the dismissal of the troublesome Ignatios in 858. (Note: On 19 December 858, Photios was a layman, on the 20th he was tonsured and over the next four days was ordained lector, sub-deacon, deacon and priest; on 25 December he was consecrated Patriarch of Constantinople. Photios was a kinsman of both Bardas and Michael III.) Ignatios was a castrated son of Michael I Rhangabe (r. 811–813) and had deposed one of his predecessor Methodios' associates, Gregory Asbestas, the archbishop of Syracuse. Gregory appealed to the Bishop of Rome. While Gregory awaited a reply, Ignatios was deposed. In spring 859, Ignatios' supporters met in Constantinople and claimed they had deposed Photios, who responded with a synod attacking Ignatios. The stalemate prompted Michael and Photios to send an embassy to Pope Nicholas I, whose legates Radoald of Porto and Zacharias of Anagni approved the deposition of Ignatios at the Council of Constantinople of 861. However, perhaps partly due to the presence of Ignatios' supporters in Rome, Nicholas convened a council in 863 to overrule his legates, declaring that Photios and Asbestas were deposed, leading to the Photian schism. Michael then wrote a contemptuous letter about the alleged barbarity of Latin Rome.

Fearing the potential conversion of Boris I of Bulgaria (r. 852–889) to Christianity under Frankish influence, Michael III and the Caesar Bardas invaded Bulgaria, imposing the conversion of Boris according to the Byzantine rite, as part of the peace settlement of 864. Michael stood as sponsor, by proxy, for Boris at his baptism. Boris took the additional name of Michael at the ceremony. The Byzantines also allowed the Bulgarians to reclaim the contested border region of Zagora. In 866, Boris appeared to have second thoughts and sought patronage from the Franks and Pope Nicholas I, requesting a Latin archbishop. He corresponded with Nicholas, who responded to him by expressing approval of Bulgar customs and severely criticising those of Byzantium. Photios responded by enumerating western doctrinal and disciplinary deviations in an encyclical, deposing Nicholas and requesting Louis the German's aid in overthrowing him. Michael presided over a synod in 867 in which Photios and the three other eastern patriarchs excommunicated Pope Nicholas and condemned the Latin filioque clause concerning the procession of the Holy Spirit. The conflict over the patriarchal throne and supreme authority within the church was exacerbated by the success of the active missionary efforts launched by Photios. In the same year, Michael was assassinated and Basil reinstated Ignatios. Despite Ignatios' papal leanings in the Photian schism, he allowed Boris to procure a Byzantine-rite archbishop in 870, and the eastern patriarchs forcefully denied any Roman authority in Bulgaria. Byzantine cultural hegemony was secured, and relations between the two empires remained peaceful throughout Michael's reign. The conversion of the Bulgarians has been evaluated as one of the greatest cultural and political achievements of the Byzantine Empire.

Under the guidance of Patriarch Photios, Michael sponsored the mission of Saints Cyril and Methodios to the Khazar Khagan in an effort to stop the expansion of Judaism among the Khazars. Although this mission was a failure, their next mission in 863 secured the conversion of Great Moravia and devised the Glagolitic alphabet for writing in Slavonic, thus allowing Slavic-speaking peoples to approach conversion to Orthodox Christianity through their own rather than an alien tongue.

=== Rise of Basil the Macedonian and assassination of Michael ===
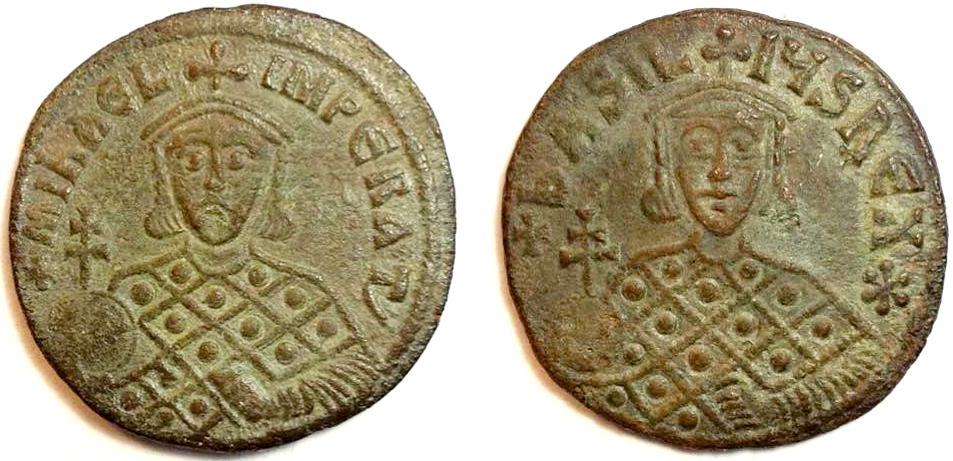
Rare coin of Michael III and Basil I with the Latin titles "imperator" and "rex" (respectively).

Michael III's marriage with Eudokia Dekapolitissa was childless, but the Emperor did not want to risk a scandal by attempting to marry his mistress Eudokia Ingerina, daughter of the Varangian (Norse) imperial guard Inger. The solution he chose was to have Ingerina marry his favorite courtier and chamberlain Basil the Macedonian. While Michael carried on his relationship with Ingerina, Basil was kept satisfied with the emperor's sister Thekla, whom her brother retrieved from a monastery. According to Joseph Genesios, Michael met Basil when he heard of his wrestling ability, while other sources state that they met when Basil successfully broke in one of the Emperor's horses. Whatever the circumstances of their acquaintance, Basil was made prōtostratōr (head groom) following the execution of the incumbent, a co-conspirator in a plot of Theodora against Bardas. Michael and Basil appeared to have a common interest in equestrianism, since Michael's favourite pastimes included hunting and chariot-racing, to which end he built luxury stables.

Scholars are divided as to whether Michael and Basil were engaged in a homosexual relationship. One piece of evidence for this is Basil's appointment as parakoimōmenos, which was usually for the chief eunuch and involved close proximity to the Emperor. It is clear that they had a close relationship, with Basil gaining increasing influence over Michael. In April 866, he convinced the Emperor that Bardas was conspiring against him and was duly allowed to murder Bardas while he was preparing to embark on an expedition to Crete. Now without serious rivals, Basil was crowned co-emperor on 26 May 866 and was adopted by the much younger Michael.

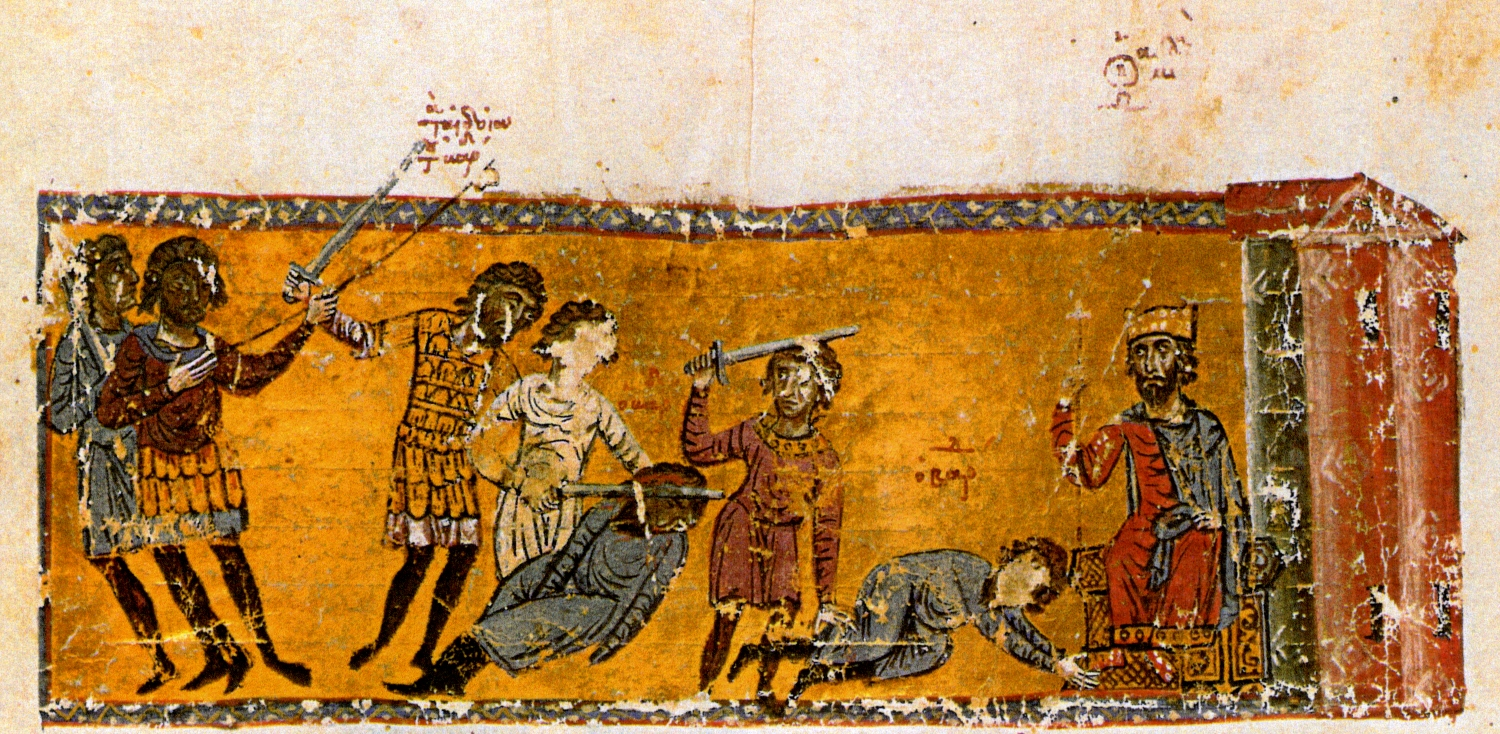
The assassination of Bardas the Caesar at the feet of Michael III

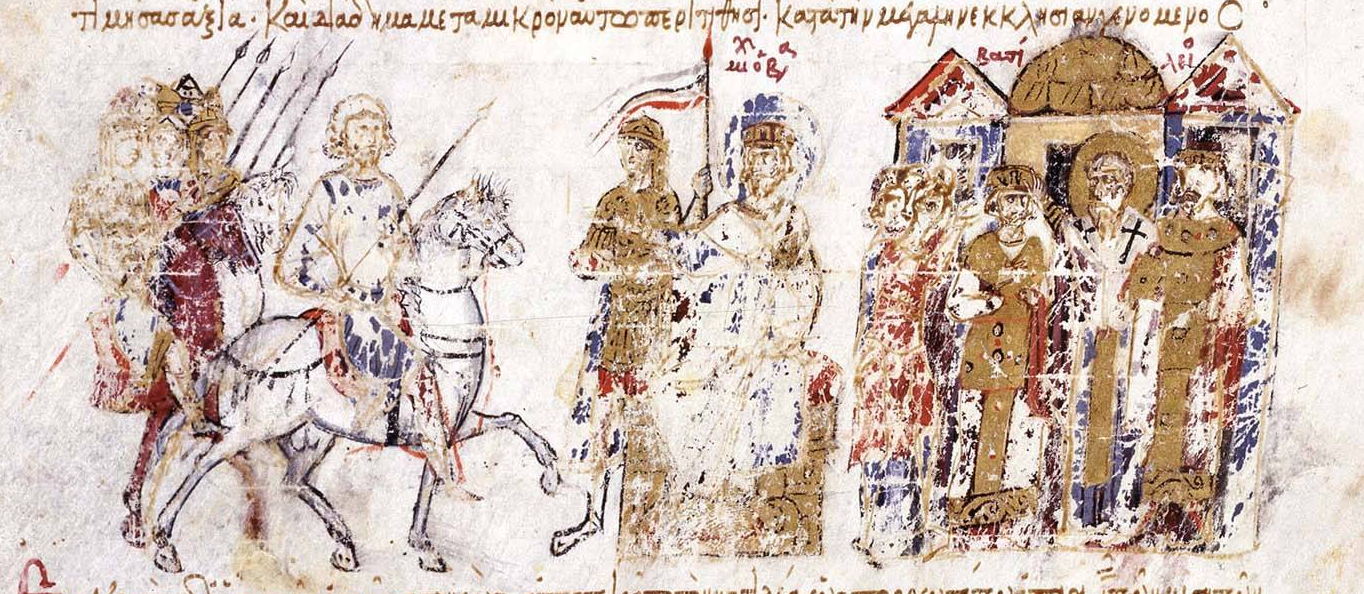
Coronation of Basil the Macedonian as co-emperor (right)

This curious development may have been intended to legitimise the eventual succession to the throne of Eudokia Ingerina's son Leo, who was widely believed to be Michael's son. Michael celebrated the birth of Leo with public chariot races, a sport he enthusiastically patronized and participated in. If ensuring Leo's legitimacy had been Michael's plan, it backfired. Ostensibly troubled by the favour Michael was beginning to show to another courtier, named Basiliskianos, whom he threatened to raise as another co-emperor, Basil had Michael assassinated as he lay insensible in his bedchamber following a drinking bout on 24 September 867. (Note: Some modern authorities give 23 September, but this is a mistake. The origin of the confusion can be traced to J. B. Bury's History of the Eastern Roman Empire (1912). Bury, citing the Theophanes Continuatus, first gives Michael's death as 24 September, but then inexplicably changes it to 23 September later in the book.) Basil with a number of his male relatives, plus other accomplices, entered Michael's apartment; the locks had been tampered with and no guard had been placed. Michael's end was grisly; a man named John of Chaldia killed him, cutting off both the emperor's hands with a sword before finishing him off with a thrust to the heart. Basil, as the sole remaining emperor (Basiliskianos had presumably been disposed of at the same time as Michael), automatically succeeded as the ruling basileus.

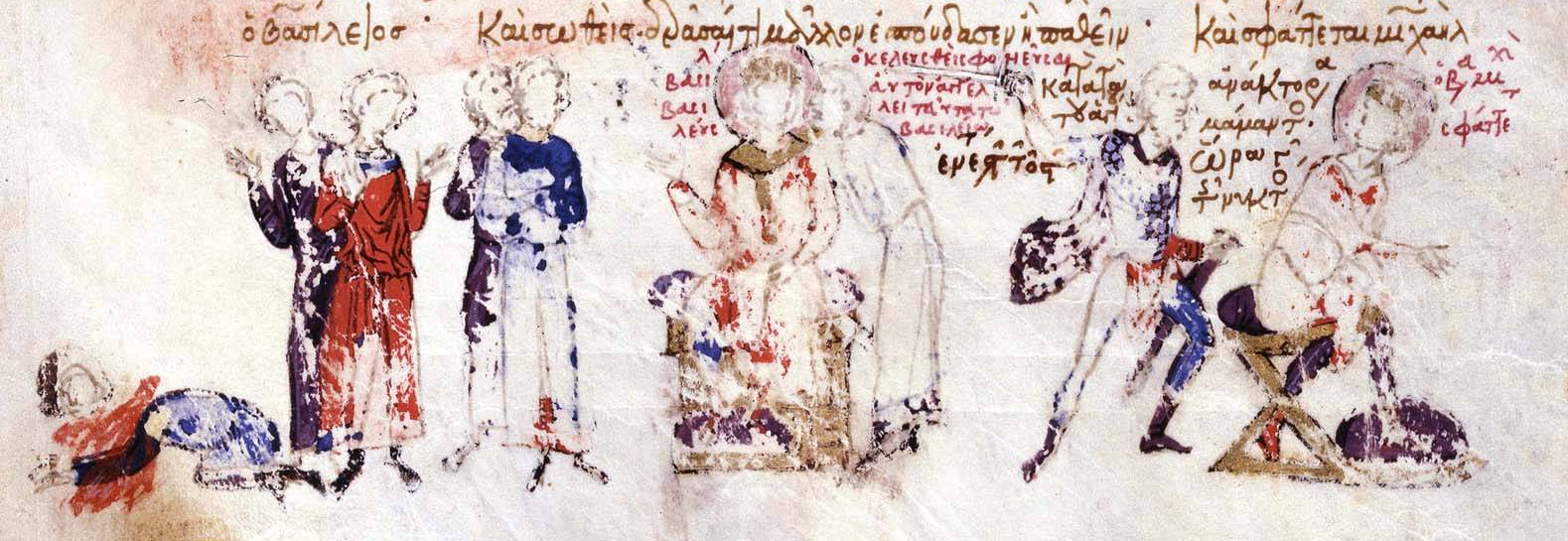
The assassination of Michael III (right) and the proclamation of Basil I (center) as the new basileus.

Michael's remains were buried in the Philippikos Monastery at Chrysopolis on the Asian shore of the Bosphoros. When Leo VI became ruling emperor in 886, one of his first acts was to have Michael's body exhumed and reburied, with great ceremony, in the imperial mausoleum in the Church of the Holy Apostles in Constantinople. This contributed to the suspicion held by the Byzantine public that Leo was (or at least believed himself to be) Michael's son.

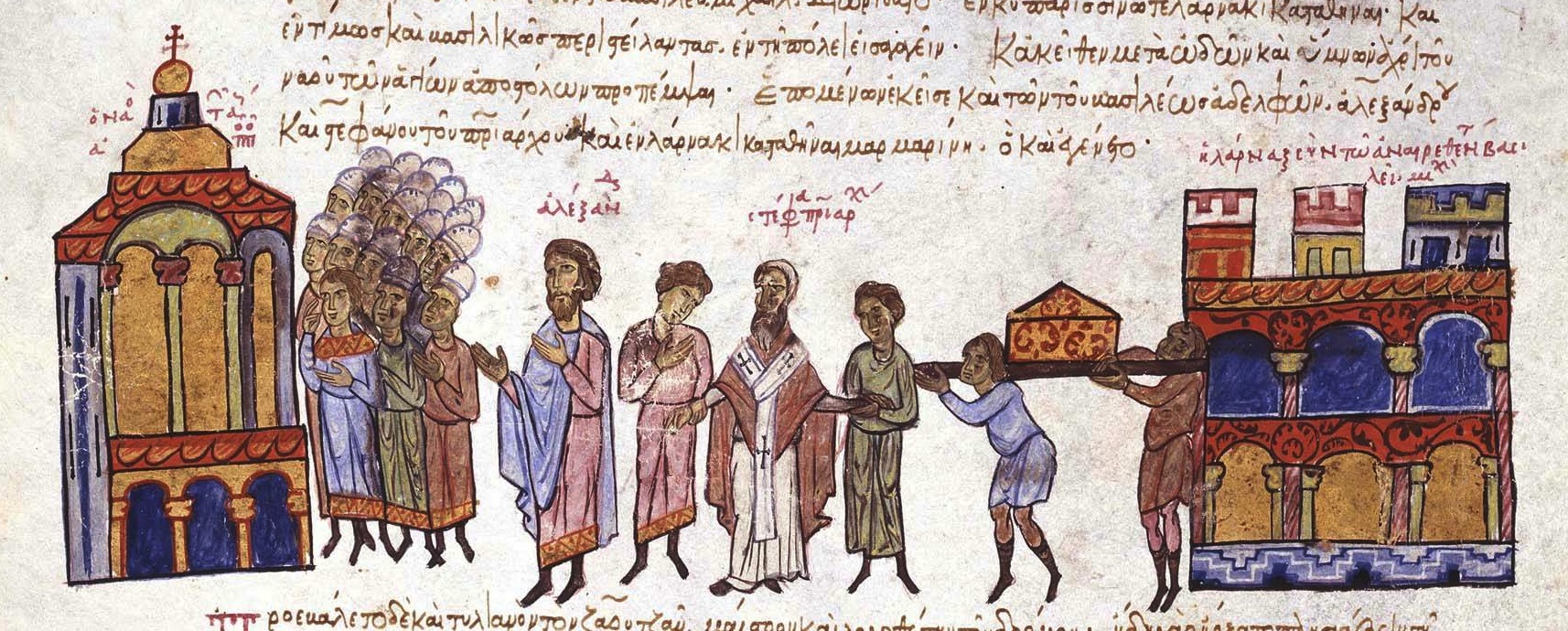
Leo VI presiding over the transfer of the remains of Michael III to the imperial mausoleum at the Church of the Holy Apostles

== Assessment and legacy ==
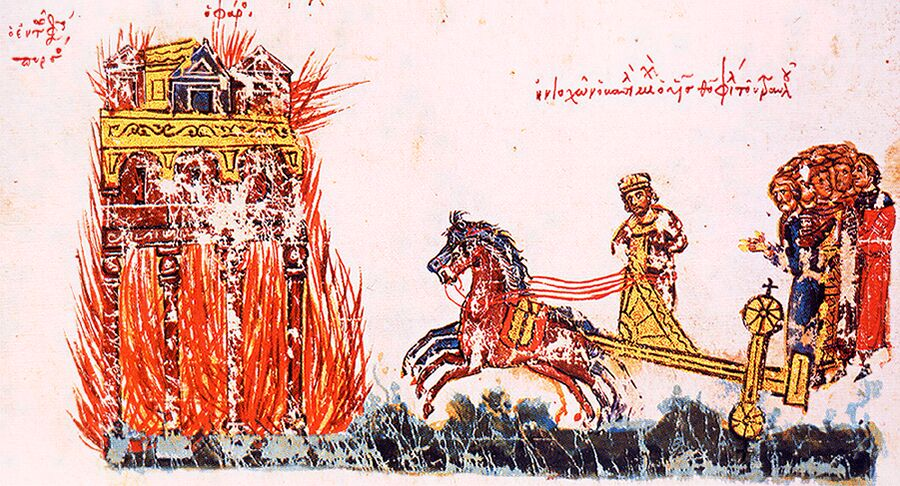
Michael III rides a chariot before the Church of Saint Mamas.

The reign and personality of Michael are difficult to evaluate because of the hostile accounts written by Byzantine authors operating under Basil I (r. 867–886) and his successors. Byzantine accounts describe Michael's habitual drunkenness, his obsession with chariot racing and his orchestration of public displays mocking the processions and rituals of the church. His court's politics were characterised by scandal including the assassinations of Bardas, Theoktistos and bizarre relationships with his wife, Eudokia Dekapolitissa, mistress, Eudokia Ingerina and Basil's mistress, Michael's own sister Thekla. And finally Michael's own assassination at the hands of his trusted courtier Basil. The impression gained from Arab sources, however, is one of Michael as an active and often successful military commander. He was also very active in repairing the Walls of Constantinople. Chroniclers of Basil accuse Michael of allowing the registers of military personnel to decline, forcing Basil to undertake a major recruitment effort during his own reign, however the decline could be explained as a natural process due to aging.

As the end of the iconoclast period, Michael's reign was the beginning of a period of religious peace with an established orthodoxy and liturgy, which was not to be interfered with by the emperor.

Despite the bias of the sources, there was a clear continuity in policy between Michael and Basil, which was in the security of the borders with the Abbasid Caliphate and First Bulgarian Empire, as well as opportunism regarding the Moravians, Armenians and Rus'.

Though Michael was allegedly prone to squander money, his reign stabilised the economy, and by the year 850 the empire's annual revenues had increased to 3,300,000 nomismata. The definitive end to iconoclasm early in his reign led, unsurprisingly, to a renaissance in visual arts. The Empire made considerable advances in internal organisation and religious cohesion, and it had more than held its own against the Abbasid Caliphate. Most importantly Bulgaria had been transformed into a religious and cultural satellite of Byzantium. Much of the credit for these achievements, however, must go to Theodora and Theoktistos up to 855, and Bardas and Petronas thereafter.

== Family ==
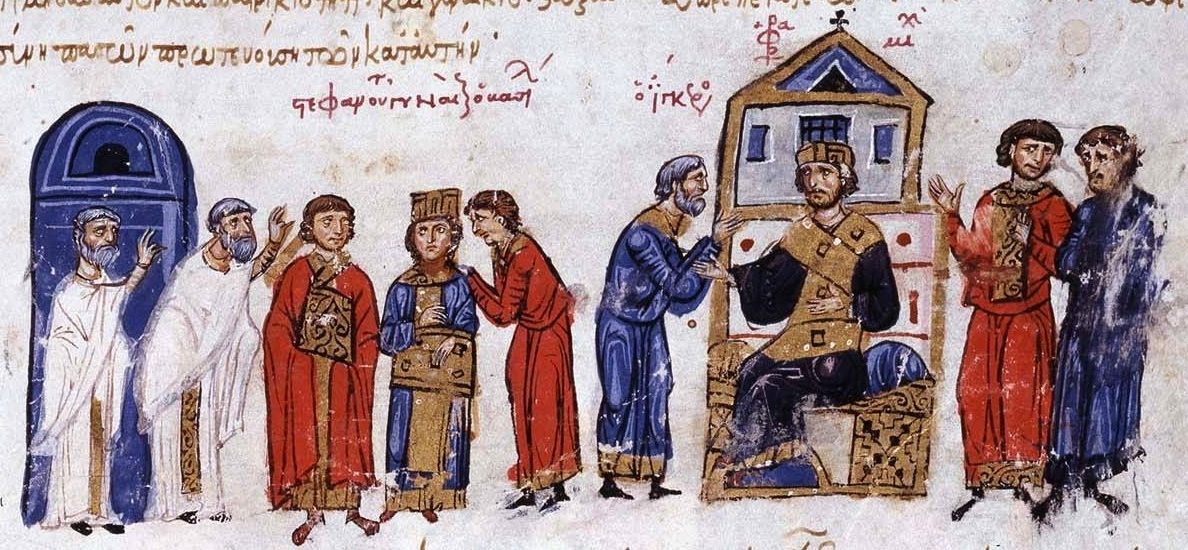
Eudokia Ingerina's wedding to Basil I.

Michael III had no children by his wife Eudokia Dekapolitissa but was conjectured to have fathered one or two sons by his mistress Eudokia Ingerina, who was married to Basil I:

- Leo VI, who succeeded Basil I as emperor in 886
- Stephen I, patriarch of Constantinople.

== See also ==
- List of Byzantine emperors

== Sources ==
=== Primary sources ===
- Bekker, Immanuel, ed. (1838). "Libri IV: 44". Theophanes Continuatus – Corpus Scriptorum Historiae Byzantinae. Vol. 45. pp. 208–210. "... ab imperatoris ipsis excubitoribus in sancti praeclari martyris Mamantis palatio neci traditur, die vigesima quarta Septembris, indictione prima, anni 6376, hora noctis tertia."
- Featherstone, Jeffrey Michael and Signes-Codoñer, Juan (translators). Chronographiae quae Theophanis Continuati nomine fertur Libri I–IV (Chronicle of Theophanes Continuatus Books I–IV, comprising the reigns of Leo V the Armenian to Michael III), Berlin, Boston: De Gruyter, 2015.
- Kaldellis, A. (trans.). On the reigns of the emperors (the history of Joseph Genesios), Canberra: Australian Association for Byzantine Studies; Byzantina Australiensia 11, 1998.
- Ševčenko, Ihor (trans.). Chronographiae quae Theophanis Continuati nomine fertur Liber quo Vita Basilii Imperatoris amplectitur (Chronicle of Theophanes Continuatus comprising the Life of Basil I), Berlin: De Gruyter, 2011.
- The Chronicle of the Logothete. Translated by Wahlgren, Staffan. Liverpool University Press. 2019.
- Wortley, John (trans.). A synopsis of Byzantine history, 811–1057 (the history of John Scylitzes, active 1081), Cambridge University Press, 2010.

=== Secondary sources ===
- Ahrweiler, H.; Laiou, A.E. (1998). Studies on the Internal Diaspora of the Byzantine Empire. Dumbarton Oaks.
- Auzépy, Marie-France (2008). "State of emergency (700–850)". In Shepard, Jonathan (ed.). The Cambridge history of the Byzantine Empire (c. 500–1492). Cambridge University Press. ISBN 978-0-521-83231-1.
- Brubaker, Leslie; Haldon, John (2011). Byzantium in the iconoclast era, c. 680–850. Cambridge University Press. ISBN 978-0-521-43093-7.
- Bury, J. B. (1912). A history of the Eastern Roman Empire from the fall of Irene to the accession of Basil I (A.D. 802-867). London: Macmillan.
- Fine, John V. A. Jr. (1991) [1983]. The Early Medieval Balkans: A Critical Survey from the Sixth to the Late Twelfth Century. Ann Arbor: University of Michigan Press. ISBN 0-472-08149-7.
- Finlay, G. (1856). History of the Byzantine Empire from DCCXVI to MLVII (2nd ed.). W. Blackwood.
- Fossier, R. (1986). The Cambridge illustrated history of the Middle Ages. Cambridge University Press.
- Gjuzelev, Vasil (1988). Medieval Bulgaria, Byzantine Empire, Black Sea, Venice, Genoa (Centre Culturel du Monde Byzantin). Verlag Baier, Villach.
- Gregory, Timothy E. (2010). A History of Byzantium. Wiley-Blackwell. ISBN 978-1-4051-8471-7.
- Grierson, Philip (1973). Catalogue of the Byzantine Coins in the Dumbarton Oaks Collection. Vol. 3. Dumbarton Oaks. ISBN 9780884020455.
- Kazhdan, Alexander, ed. (1991). "Michael III". The Oxford Dictionary of Byzantium. Oxford and New York: Oxford University Press. p. 1364. ISBN 0-19-504652-8.
- Mango, Cyril (1967). "When Was Michael III Born?". Dumbarton Oaks Papers. 21: 253–258. doi:10.2307/1291264. JSTOR 1291264.
- McCormick, Michael (2008). "Western Approaches (700–900)". In Shepard, Jonathan (ed.). The Cambridge history of the Byzantine Empire (c. 500–1492). Cambridge University Press. ISBN 978-0-521-83231-1.
- Tougher, Shaun (1997). The Reign of Leo VI (886–912): Politics and People. Leiden: Brill.
- Tougher, Shaun (2008). "After Iconoclasm (850–886)". In Shepard, Jonathan (ed.). The Cambridge history of the Byzantine Empire (c. 500–1492). Cambridge University Press. ISBN 978-0-521-83231-1.
- Treadgold, Warren (1997). A History of the Byzantine State and Society. Stanford, California: Stanford University Press. ISBN 0-8047-2630-2.

Michael III Phrygian dynasty Born: 9 January 840 Died: 24 September 867
Regnal titles
Preceded by Theophilos	Byzantine emperor 842–867	Succeeded by Basil I
Political offices
Preceded by Theophilos in 830, then lapsed	Roman consul 843	Succeeded by Lapsed, Basil I in 867
