= Basil I =

Byzantine emperor from 867 to 886

- Emperor and Autocrat of the Romans
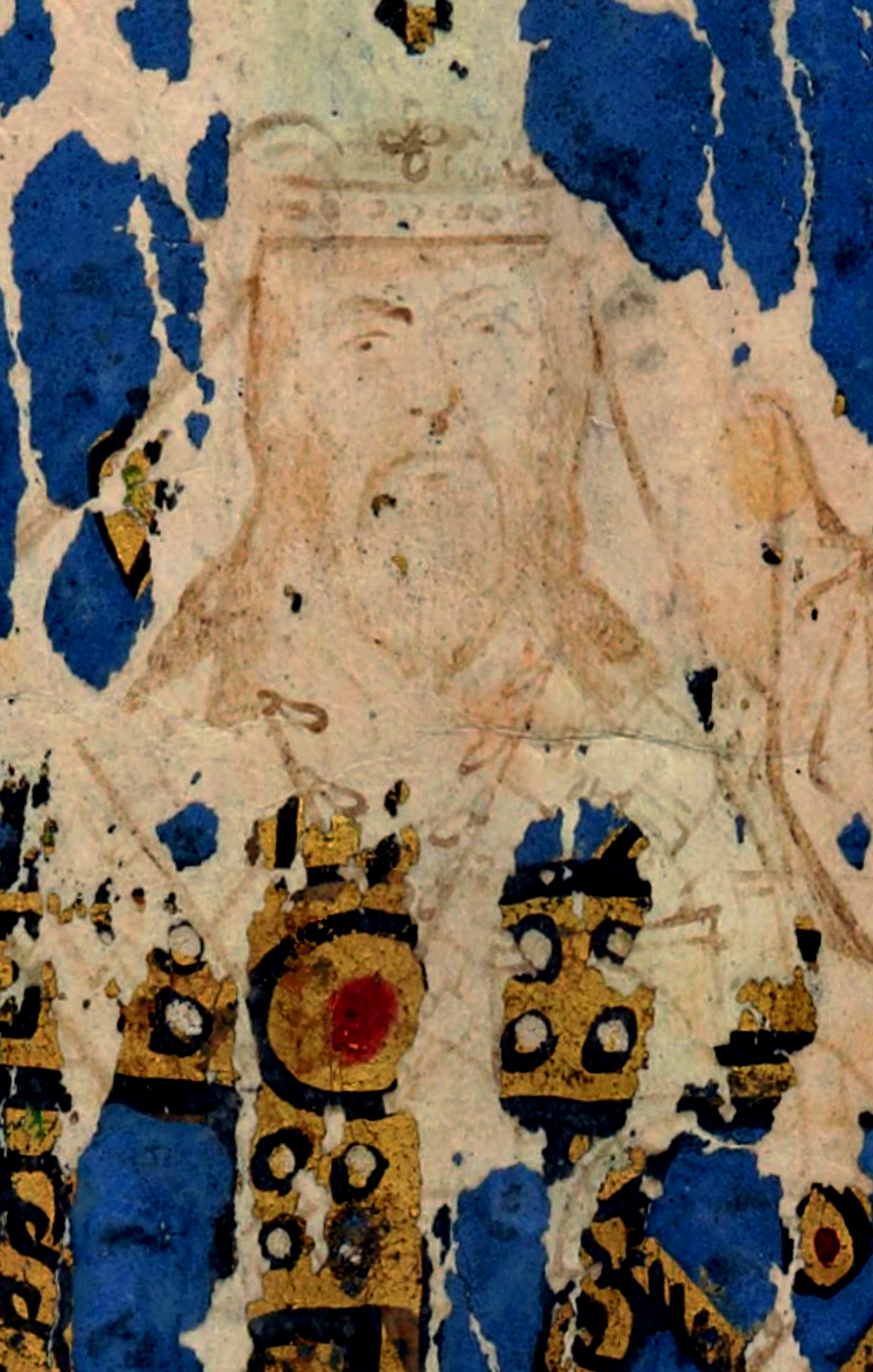
- Underdrawing of Basil I in the Paris Gregory, c. 879–883

Byzantine emperor
- Reign: 24 September 867 – 29 August 886
- Coronation: 26 May 866 (as co-emperor)
- Predecessor: Michael III
- Successor: Leo VI
- Co-emperor: Constantine (868–879); Leo VI (870–886); Alexander (879–886)
- Born: Late 811; Chariopolis, Macedonia, Byzantine Empire
- Died: 29 August 886 (aged 74–75)
- Consort: Eudokia Ingerina
- Wives: Maria; Eudokia Ingerina
- Issue Among others: Constantine; Emperor Alexander; Emperor Leo VI (Note: May have actually been Michael III's son.); Patriarch Stephen I
Regnal name
- Ancient Greek: Αὐτοκράτωρ Καῖσαρ Βασίλειος Αὐγουστος, romanized: Autokrátōr Kaîsar Basíleios Aúgoustos (Note: Full title attested to in the Prochiron: Αὐτοκράτωρ Καῖσαρ Βασίλειος εὐτυχής εὐσεβής εὐτυχής ἔνδοξος νικητής τροπαιοῦχος, ἀεισέβαστος πιστός αὐγουστος ("Autokrator Caesar Basil fortunate, pious, renowned, victorious, triumphant, ever-venerable, faithful Augustus").)
- Dynasty: Macedonian
- Father: Bardas/Constantine
- Mother: Pankalo
- Religion: Chalcedonian Christianity
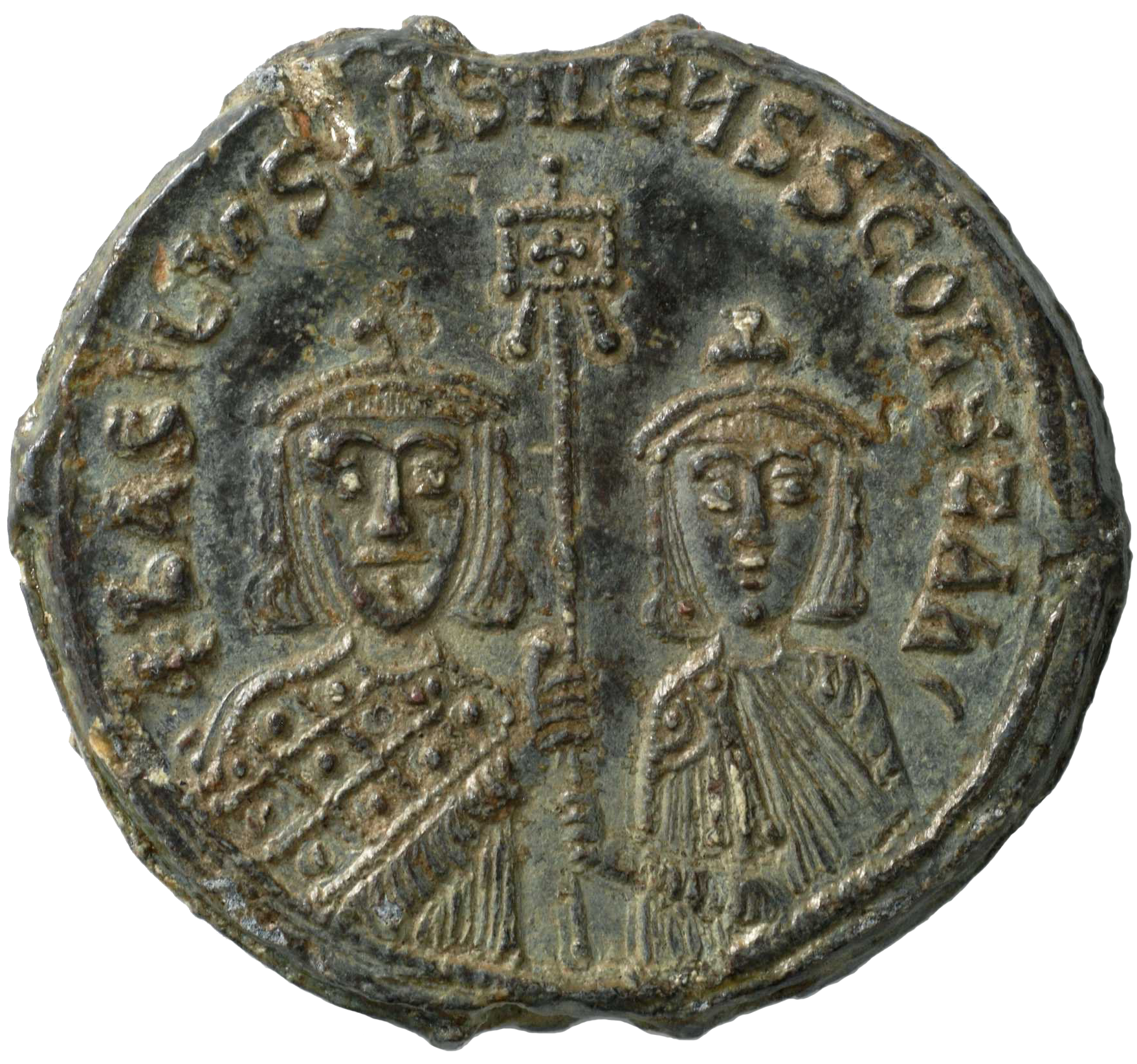
- Seal

Basil I, nicknamed "the Macedonian" (Greek: Βασίλειος ὁ Μακεδών, romanized: Basíleios ho Makedṓn; 811 – 29 August 886), was Byzantine emperor from 867 to 886. Born to a peasant family in the theme of Macedonia, he rose to prominence in the imperial court after gaining the favour of Emperor Michael III, whose mistress he married on his emperor's orders. In 866, Michael proclaimed him co-emperor. Fearing a loss of influence, Basil orchestrated Michael's assassination the next year and installed himself as sole ruler of the empire. He was the first ruler of the Macedonian dynasty.

Despite his humble origins, Basil was an effective and respected monarch. He initiated a complete overhaul of Byzantine law, an effort continued by his successor that ultimately became the Basilika. On the foreign front, he achieved military success against the heretical Paulicians, whom he subjugated in 872. He also pursued an active policy in the west, allying with Carolingian emperor Louis II against the Arabs, which led to a new period of Byzantine domination in Italy. Upon his death in a hunting accident in 886, he was succeeded by his son Leo VI, also rumoured to have been the son of Michael III.

== From peasant to emperor ==
Basil was born to peasant parents in late 811 (or sometime in the 830s in the estimation of some scholars) at Chariopolis in the Byzantine theme of Macedonia (an administrative division corresponding to the area of Adrianople in Thrace). The theory that Basil may have been born in the 830's might better explain that the young Emperor Michael III later chose him as his favorite. His father was named Bardas/Constantine, his mother Pankalo, and his paternal grandfather Maiktes/Leo. His paternal grandmother's father was named Leo/Maiktes. His ethnic origin is unknown and has been a subject of debate.

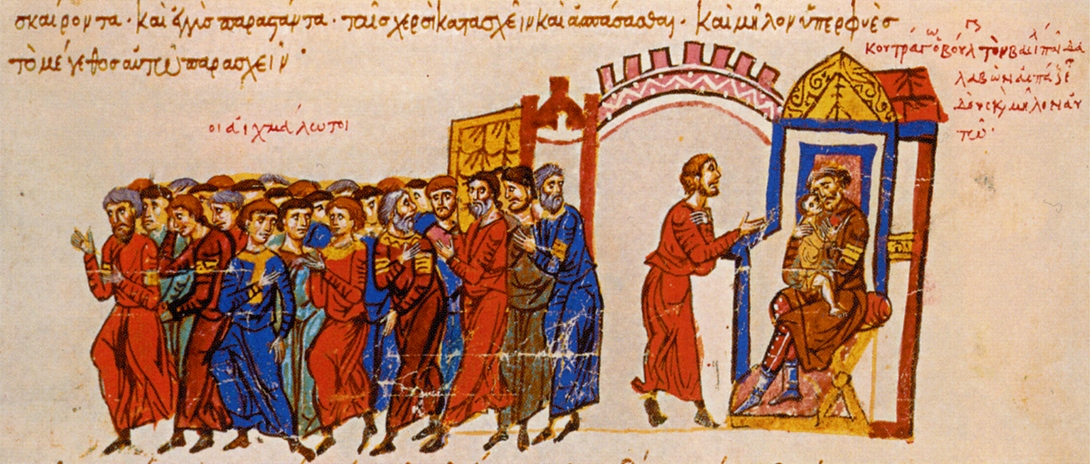
A young Basil at the court of Omurtag of Bulgaria

During Basil's reign, an elaborate genealogy was produced that purported that his ancestors were not mere peasants, as everyone believed, but descendants of the Arsacid (Arshakuni) kings of Armenia, Alexander the Great and also of Constantine the Great. The Armenian historians Samuel of Ani and Stephen of Taron record that he hailed from the village of Thil in Taron. In contrast, Persian writers such as Hamza al-Isfahani, or al-Tabari, call both Basil and his mother Saqlabi, an ethnogeographic term that usually denoted the Slavs, but can also be interpreted as a generic term encompassing the inhabitants of the region between Constantinople and Bulgaria. Claims have therefore been made for an Armenian, Slavic, or indeed "Armeno-Slavonic" origin for Basil's father. The name of his mother points to a Greek origin on the maternal side. The general scholarly consensus is that Basil's father was "probably" of Armenian origin, and settled in Byzantine Thrace. His close associates and friends were mostly Armenians and, besides Greek, he might have spoken Armenian as well. Norman Tobias, the author of the only dedicated biography of Basil I in English, concluded that it is impossible to be certain what the ethnic origins of the emperor were, though Basil was definitely reliant on the support of Armenians in prominent positions within the Byzantine Empire.

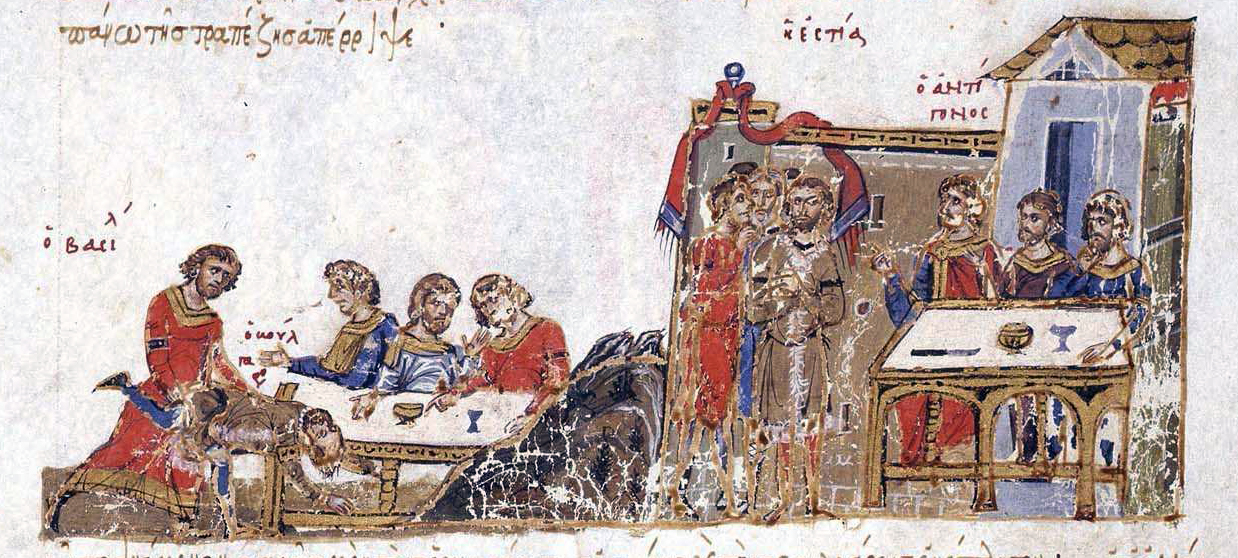
Basil victorious in a wrestling match against a Bulgarian champion (far left), from the Madrid Skylitzes manuscript

One story asserts that he had spent a part of his childhood in captivity in Bulgaria, where his family had, allegedly, been carried off as captives of the Khan Krum (r. 803–814) in 813. Basil lived there until 836, when he and several others escaped to Byzantine-held territory in Thrace. Basil was ultimately lucky enough to enter the service of Theophilitzes, a relative of the Caesar Bardas (the uncle of Emperor Michael III), as a groom. While serving Theophilitzes, he visited the city of Patras, where he gained the favour of Danielis, a wealthy woman who took him into her household and endowed him with a fortune. He also earned the notice of Michael III by his abilities as a horse tamer and in winning a victory over a Bulgarian champion in a wrestling match; he soon became the Byzantine Emperor's companion, confidant, and bodyguard (parakoimomenos). Symeon Magister describes Basil as "... most outstanding in bodily form and heavy set; his eyebrows grew together, he had large eyes and a broad chest, and a rather downcast expression".

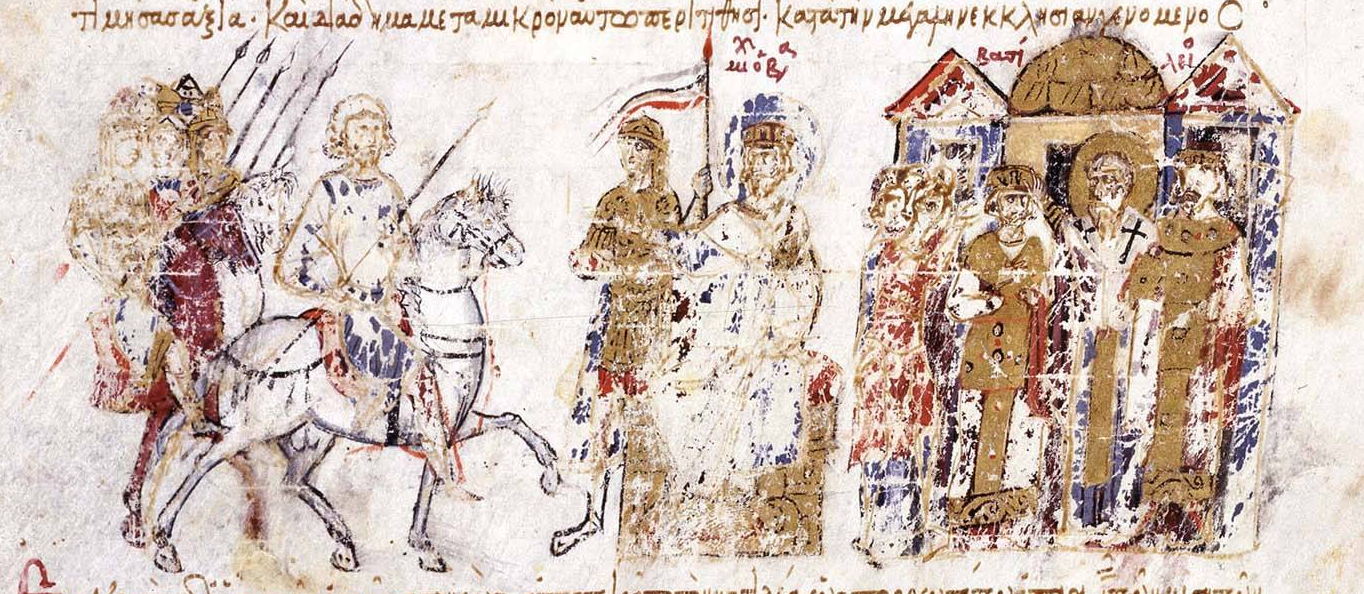
The coronation of Basil I as co-emperor, from the Madrid Skylitzes manuscript

On Emperor Michael's orders, Basil divorced his wife Maria and married Eudokia Ingerina, Michael's favourite mistress, in around 865. Around the same time, Michael III offered him his sister Thekla as a mistress. Basil had an affair with her until 870, when he discovered that she was being unfaithful to him and, for this reason, he sent her back to the convent she had been immured in previously. During an expedition against the Arabs, Basil convinced Michael III that his uncle Bardas coveted the Byzantine throne, and subsequently murdered Bardas with Michael's approval on 21 April 866. Basil then became the leading personality at court and was invested in the now vacant dignity of kaisar (Caesar), before being crowned co-emperor on 26 May 866. This promotion may have included Basil's adoption by Michael III, himself a much younger man. It was commonly believed that Leo VI, Basil's successor and reputed son, was really the son of Michael. Although Basil seems to have shared this belief (and hated Leo), the subsequent promotion of Basil to caesar and then co-emperor provided the child with a legitimate and Imperial parent and secured his succession to the Byzantine throne. When Leo was born, Michael III celebrated the event with public chariot races, whilst he pointedly instructed Basil not to presume on his new position as junior emperor.

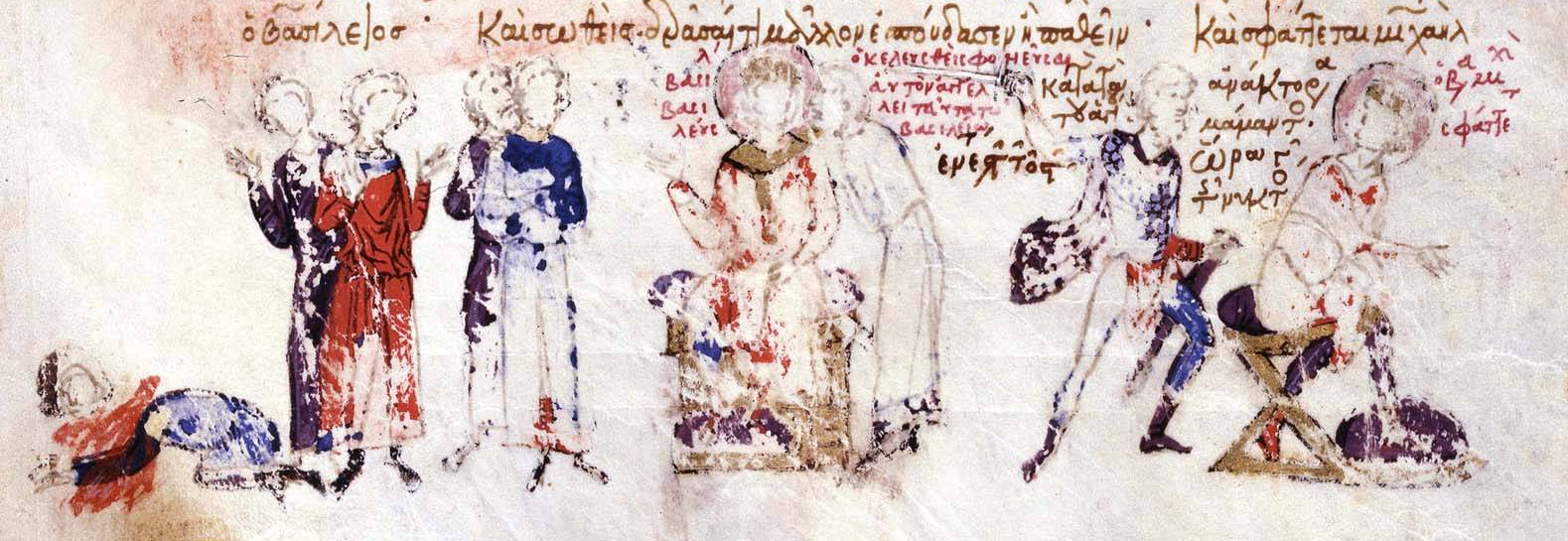
The murder of Michael III and the proclamation of Basil I as the new emperor

When Michael III started to favour another courtier, Basiliskianos, Basil felt that his position was being undermined. Michael threatened to invest Basiliskianos with the Imperial title and this induced Basil to pre-empt events by organizing the assassination of Michael on the night of 24 September 867. (Note: Some modern authorities give 23 September, but this is a mistake. The origin of the confusion can be traced to J. B. Bury's History of the Eastern Roman Empire (1912). Bury, citing the Theophanes Continuatus, first gives Michael's death as 24 September, but then inexplicably changes it to 23 September later in the book.) Michael and Basiliskianos were insensibly drunk following a banquet at the palace of Anthimos when Basil, with a small group of companions (including his father Bardas, brother Marinos, and cousin Ayleon), (Note: The name of the father of Basil is unrecorded; however, Byzantine naming conventions are sometimes used to predict that of a relative. The names of Basil's male siblings and other relatives are recorded from later in his reign.) gained entry. The locks to the chamber doors had been tampered with and the chamberlain had not posted guards; both victims were then put to the sword. (Note: A man named John of Chaldia killed Michael III, cutting off both the Emperor's hands before returning to stab him in the heart.) On Michael III's death, Basil, as an already acclaimed co-emperor, automatically became the ruling basileus.

== Reign ==
Basil I became an effective and respected monarch despite being a man with no formal education and little military or administrative experience. Moreover, he had been the boon companion of a debauched monarch and had achieved power through a series of calculated murders. That there was little political reaction to the murder of Michael III is probably due to his unpopularity with the bureaucrats of Constantinople because of his disinterest in the administrative duties of the Imperial office. Also, Michael's public displays of impiety had alienated the Byzantine populace in general. Once in power Basil soon showed that he intended to rule effectively and as early as his coronation he displayed an overt religiosity by formally dedicating his crown to Christ. He maintained a reputation for conventional piety and orthodoxy throughout his 19-year-long reign.

=== Domestic policies ===
Because of the great legislative work which Basil I undertook, he is often called the "second Justinian". Basil's laws were collected in the Basilika, consisting of sixty books, and smaller legal manuals known as the Eisagoge. Leo VI was responsible for completing these legal works. The Basilika remained the law of the Byzantine Empire down to its conquest by the Ottomans. Ironically, this codification of laws seems to have begun under the direction of the caesar Bardas who was murdered by Basil. Basil personally oversaw the construction of the Nea Ekklesia cathedral and his palatine hall the Kainourgion. His ecclesiastical policy was marked by good relations with Rome. One of his first acts was to exile the Patriarch of Constantinople, Photios, and restore his rival Ignatios, whose claims were supported by Pope Adrian II.

=== Foreign affairs ===
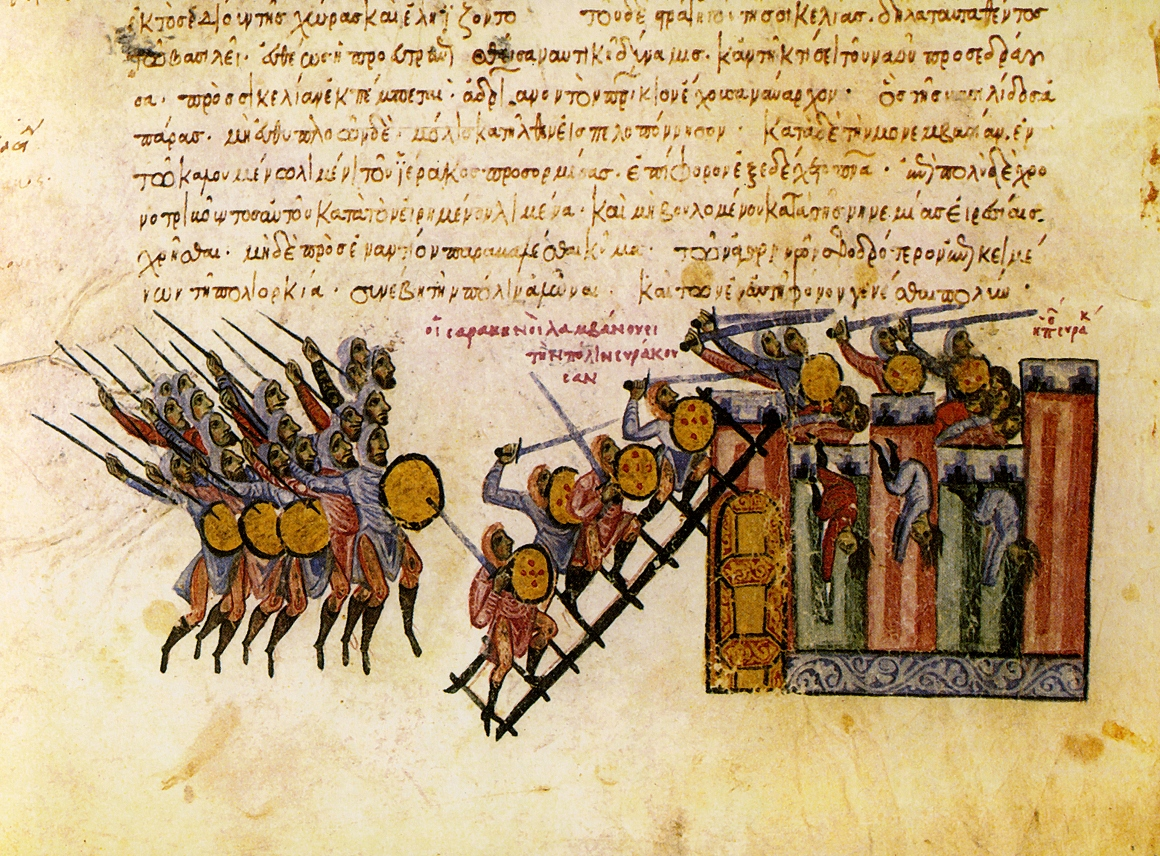
The Sicilian stronghold of Syracuse falls to the Arabs in 878.

Emperor Basil's reign was marked by the troublesome ongoing war with the heretical Paulicians, centered on Tephrike on the upper Euphrates, who rebelled, allied with the Arabs, and raided as far as Nicaea, sacking Ephesus. Basil's general, Christopher, defeated the Paulicians in 872, and the death of their leader, Chrysocheir, led to the definite subjection of their state. Basil was the first Byzantine emperor since Constans II (r. 641–668) to pursue an active policy to restore the Empire's power in the West. Basil allied with Holy Roman Emperor Louis II (r. 850–875) against the Arabs and sent a fleet of 139 ships to clear the Adriatic Sea of their raids. With Byzantine help, Louis II captured Bari from the Arabs in 871. The city eventually became Byzantine territory in 876. However, the Byzantine position in Sicily deteriorated, and Syracuse fell to the Emirate of Sicily in 878. This was ultimately Basil's fault as he had diverted a relief fleet from Sicily to haul marble for a church instead. Although most of Sicily was lost, the general Nikephoros Phokas (the Elder) succeeded in taking Taranto and much of Calabria in 880. The successes in the Italian Peninsula opened a new period of Byzantine domination there. Above all, the Byzantines were beginning to establish a strong presence in the Mediterranean Sea, and especially the Adriatic.

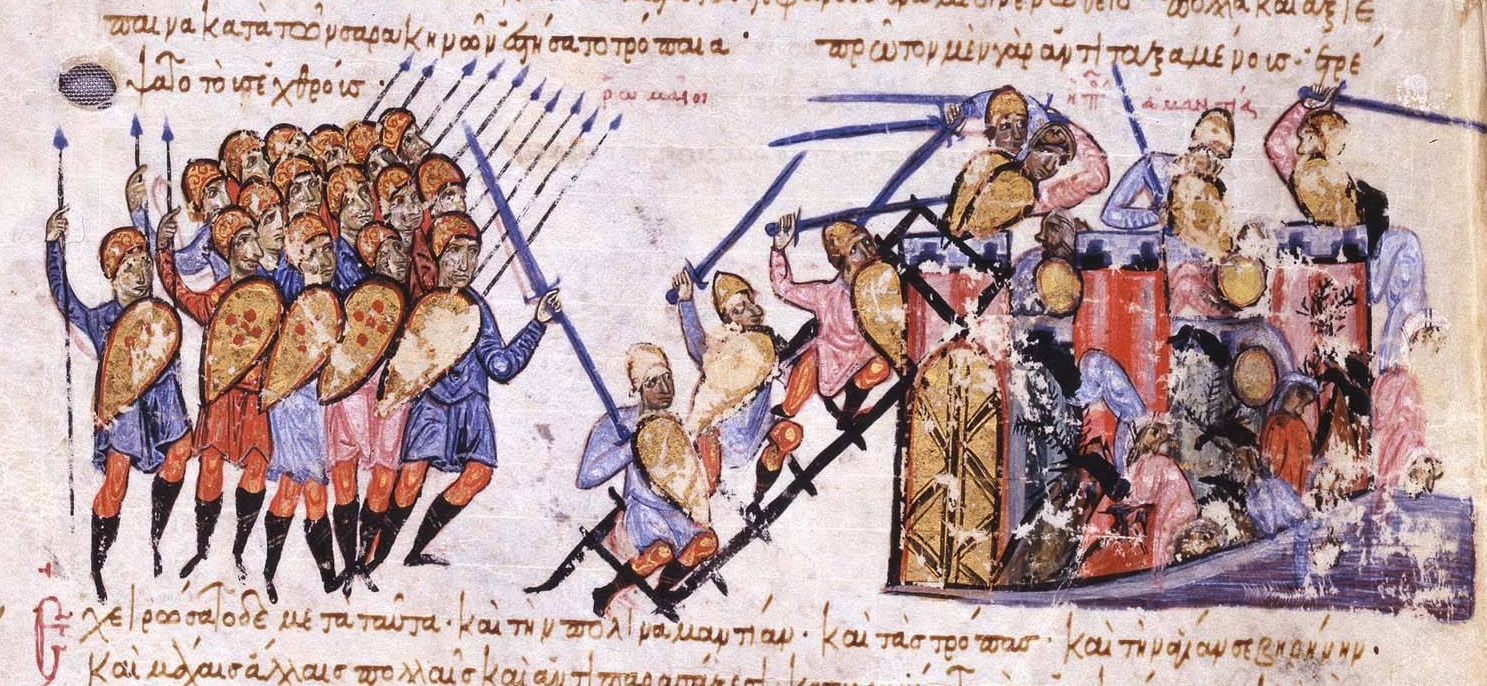
The army under Nikephoros Phokas the Elder captures the city of Amantia in Italy.

=== Last years and succession ===
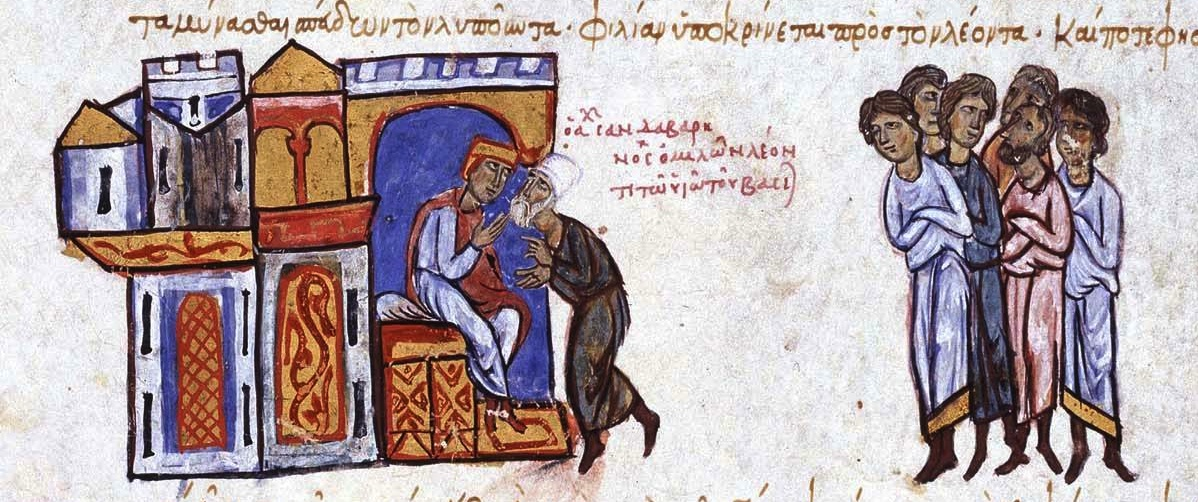
Santabarenos the Monk advises Prince Leo to carry a knife.

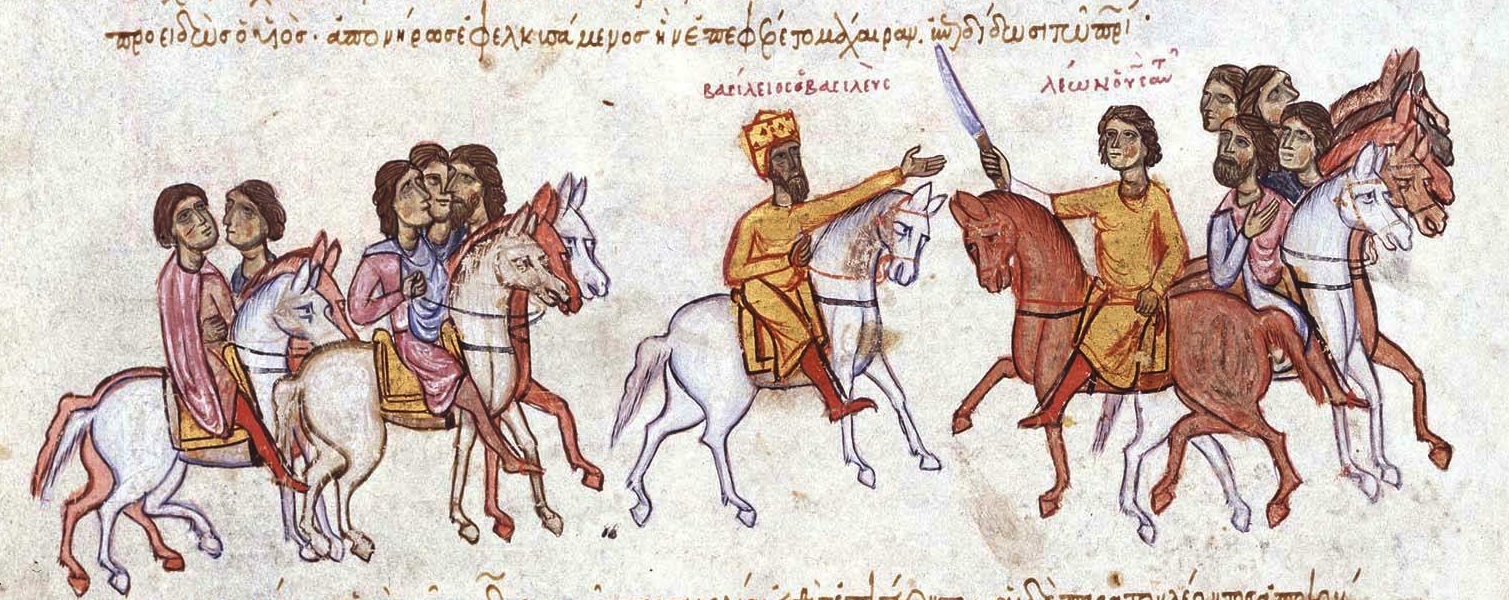
Basil I and his son Leo. Leo is discovered carrying a knife in the emperor's presence.

Basil's spirits declined in 879, when his eldest and favourite son, Constantine, died. Basil now raised his youngest son, Alexander, to the rank of co-emperor. Basil disliked the bookish Leo, on occasion physically beating him; he probably suspected Leo of being the son of Michael III. In his later years, Basil's relationship with Leo was clouded by the suspicion that the latter might wish to avenge the murder of Michael III. Leo was eventually imprisoned by Basil after Theodore Santabarenos informed him of a plot against him, but the imprisonment resulted in public rioting; Basil threatened to blind Leo but was dissuaded by Patriarch Photios. Leo was eventually released after the passage of three years. Basil died on 29 August 886, from a fever contracted after a serious hunting accident when his belt was caught in the antlers of a deer, and he was allegedly dragged 25 kilometres (16 mi) through the woods. He was saved by an attendant who cut him loose with a knife, but he suspected the attendant of trying to assassinate him and had the man executed shortly before he himself died. One of the first acts of Leo VI as ruling emperor was to rebury, with great ceremony, the remains of Michael III in the Imperial Mausoleum within the Church of the Holy Apostles in Constantinople. This did much to confirm in public opinion the view that Leo considered himself to have been Michael's son.

== Family ==
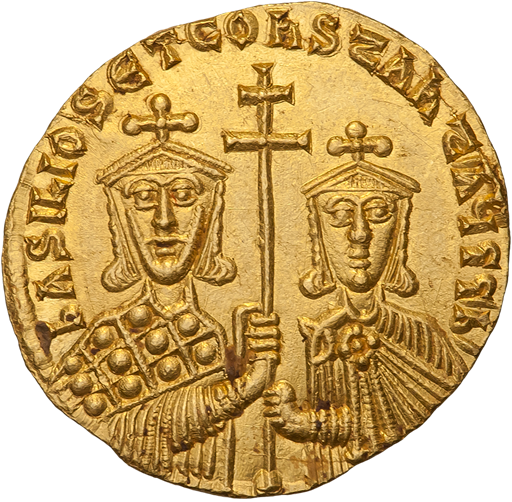
Basil I and his son Constantine

Some modern controversy and historical ambiguity surrounds Basil I's personal life, especially given a lack of contemporaneous sources. One question that has emerged in modern scholarship is whether or not Basil was involved in same-sex relationships and if such relationships played a role in his unlikely rise to power. Historian Shaun Fitzroy Tougher cites a history written by George the Monk that uses the Greek word pothos to describe Basil's relationship with Michael, a word which had historically been used in some Greek Christian sources to describe the desire between a wife and a husband. However, within the law code, the Basilika, inaugurated by Basil I, the illegal nature of male homosexuality and its, largely theoretical, capital punishment were retained in full.

Aspects of the family relationships of Basil I are likewise uncertain and open to a variety of interpretations. Therefore, the information given below should not be treated as comprehensive or definite:

- By his first wife Maria, Basil I had several children, including:
  - Bardas.
  - Anastasia, who married the general Christopher.
  - Constantine (c. 860 – 3 September 879), crowned emperor in January 868. According to George Alexandrovič Ostrogorsky, Constantine was betrothed to Ermengard of Provence, daughter of Louis II, Holy Roman Emperor, and Engelberga in 869. The marital contract was broken in 871 when relations between Basil and Louis broke down.
- By Eudokia Ingerina, Basil I had the following children:
  - Leo VI, who succeeded as Byzantine emperor and may actually have been a son of Michael III.
  - Stephen I, Patriarch of Constantinople, who may also actually have been a son of Michael III.
  - Alexander, who succeeded as Byzantine emperor in 912.
  - Anna Porphyrogenita, a nun at the convent of St. Euphemia in Petrion.
  - Helena Porphyrogenita, a nun at the convent of St. Euphemia in Petrion.
  - Maria Porphyrogenita, a mother of nuns at the convent of St. Euphemia in Petrion.

Leo VI's son Constantine VII wrote a biography of his grandfather, the Vita Basilii, around 950.

== In popular culture ==
- Harry Turtledove, a historian noted for his speculative fiction based on alternative history, has written several series set in a place called Videssos, which is a thinly disguised Byzantine Empire. The Tale of Krispos trilogy – Krispos Rising (1991), Krispos of Videssos (1991), and Krispos the Emperor (1994) – are fictionalized retellings of the rise of Basil.
- Stephen Lawhead's book Byzantium (1996) uses the succession of Basil I as seed for the conspiracy which occupies most of the novel.
- Robert Greene's book The 48 Laws of Power (1998) features Basil I's rise to power, by way of his interactions and later his manipulations of Michael III, as an example of a "transgression of the law" for Law #2, "Never put too much trust in friends, learn how to use enemies".

== See also ==
- List of Byzantine emperors

== Primary sources ==
Recent years have seen the first translations into English of a number of primary sources about Basil I and his times.

- Featherstone, Jeffrey Michael and Signes-Codoñer, Juan (translators). Chronographiae quae Theophanis Continuati nomine fertur Libri I-IV (Chronicle of Theophanes Continuatus Books I-IV, comprising the reigns of Leo V the Armenian to Michael III), Berlin, Boston: De Gruyter, 2015.
- Kaldellis, A. (trans.). On the reigns of the emperors (the history of Joseph Genesios), Canberra: Australian Association for Byzantine Studies; Byzantina Australiensia 11, 1998.
- Ševčenko, Ihor (trans.). Chronographiae quae Theophanis Continuati nomine fertur Liber quo Vita Basilii Imperatoris amplectitur (Chronicle of Theophanes Continuatus comprising the Life of Basil I), Berlin: De Gruyter, 2011.
- Wahlgren, Staffan (translator, writer of introduction and commentary). The Chronicle of the Logothete, Liverpool University Press; Translated Texts for Byzantinists, vol. 7, 2019.
- Wortley, John (trans.). A synopsis of Byzantine history, 811-1057 (the history of John Scylitzes, active 1081), Cambridge University Press, 2010.

== Secondary sources ==
- Alexander, Paul J. (1962). "The Strength of Empire and Capital as Seen through Byzantine Eyes". Speculum. 37, No. 3 July (3): 339–357. doi:10.2307/2852356. JSTOR 2852356. S2CID 155080903.
- Bury, John Bagnell (1911). "Basil I." . In Chisholm, Hugh (ed.). Encyclopædia Britannica. Vol. 03 (11th ed.). Cambridge University Press. p. 467.
- Brubaker, Leslie (1999). Vision and Meaning in Ninth-Century Byzantium: Image as Exegesis in the Homilies of Gregory of Nazianzus. Cambridge University Press. ISBN 9780521621533.
- Finlay, George (1853). History of the Byzantine Empire from DCCXVI to MLVII. Edinburgh, Scotland; London, England: William Blackwood and Sons.
- Gregory, Timothy E. (2010). A History of Byzantium. Malden, Massachusetts; West Sussex, England: Wiley-Blackwell. ISBN 978-1-4051-8471-7.
- Head, Constance (1980). "Physical Descriptions of the Emperors in Byzantine Historical Writing". Byzantion. 50 (1). Peeters Publishers: 226–240. JSTOR 44170616.
- Jenkins, Romilly (1987). Byzantium: The Imperial Centuries, AD 610–1071. Toronto, Ontario: University of Toronto Press. ISBN 0-8020-6667-4.
- Kazhdan, Alexander; Cutler, Anthony (1991a). "Basil I". Oxford Dictionary of Byzantium. Oxford University Press. p. 260. ISBN 978-0-19-504652-6.
- Kazhdan, Alexander; Cutler, Anthony (1991). "Vita Basilii". In Kazhdan, Alexander (ed.). The Oxford Dictionary of Byzantium. Oxford and New York: Oxford University Press. pp. 2180–2181. ISBN 0-19-504652-8.
- Lilie, Ralph-Johannes; Ludwig, Claudia; Zielke, Beate; Pratsch, Thomas, eds. (2013). Prosopographie der mittelbyzantinischen Zeit (in German). De Gruyter.
- Magdalino, Paul (1987). "Observations on the Nea Ekklesia of Basil I". Jahrbuch der österreichischen Byzantinistik (37): 51–64. ISSN 0378-8660.
- Mango, Cyril (1986). The Art of the Byzantine Empire 312–1453: Sources and Documents. University of Toronto Press. ISBN 978-0-8020-6627-5.
- Tobias, Norman (2007). Basil I, Founder of the Macedonian Dynasty: A Study of the Political and Military History of the Byzantine Empire in the Ninth Century. Lewiston, NY: The Edwin Mellen Press. ISBN 978-0-7734-5405-7.
- Tougher, S. (1997). The Reign of Leo VI (886–912): Politics and People. Leiden: Brill Publishers. ISBN 9004108114.
- Treadgold, Warren T. (1997). A History of the Byzantine State and Society. Stanford, CA: Stanford University Press. ISBN 9780804726306.
- Vasiliev, Alexander Alexandrovich (1928–1935). History of the Byzantine Empire. Madison, Wisconsin: The University of Wisconsin Press. ISBN 0-299-80925-0.
- Vogt, Albert; Hausherr, Isidorous, eds. (1932). "Oraison funèbre de Basile I par son fils Léon VI le Sage". Orientalia Christiana Periodica (in French). 26 (77). Rome, Italy: Pontificium Institutum Orientalium Studiorum: 39–78.

== Footnotes ==
Basil I Macedonian Dynasty Born: c. 811 Died: 29 August 886
Regnal titles
| Preceded by Michael III | Byzantine emperor 867–886, with Constantine (868–879), Leo VI (870–86) and Alexander (879–86) | Succeeded by Leo VI |
Court offices
| Preceded by Damian | Parakoimomenos; 865–866 | Succeeded by Rentakios |
Political offices
| Vacant Title last held by Michael III | Roman consul 867 | Vacant Title next held by Leo VI |
