= Euthymius I of Constantinople =

Ecumenical Patriarch of Constantinople from 907 to 912

- Ecumenical Patriarch of Constantinople
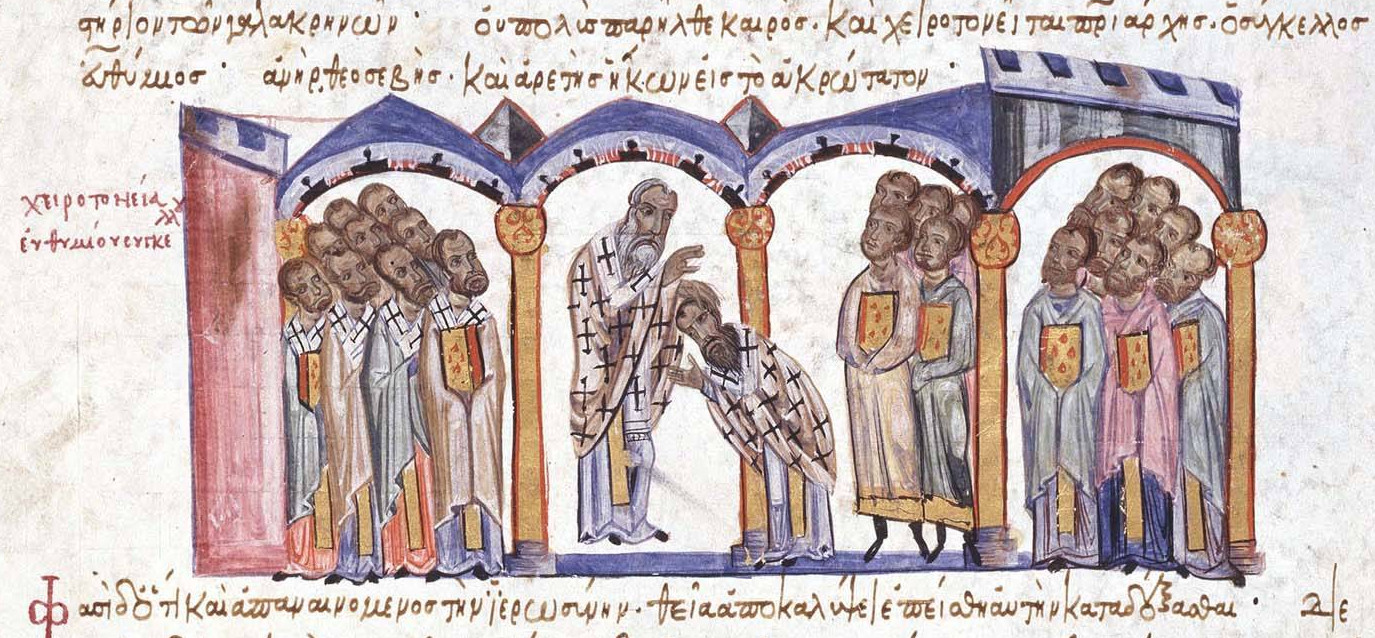
- Consecration of Euthymius I as Patriarch of Constantinople, miniature from the Madrid Skylitzes.
- Installed: February 907
- Term ended: 15 May 912
- Predecessor: Nicholas I of Constantinople
- Successor: Nicholas I of Constantinople

Personal details
- Born: c. 834 Seleucia in Isauria
- Died: 5 August 917 "ta Agathou", near Constantinople
- Denomination: Chalcedonian Christianity

Euthymius I Syncellus (Greek: Εὐθύμιος ὁ Σύγκελλος, c. 834 – 5 August 917) was the Ecumenical Patriarch of Constantinople from February 907 to 15 May 912. A monk since his youth, he became spiritual father of the future emperor Leo VI the Wise, and was raised by him to the high ecclesiastical office of syncellus. Despite his turbulent relationship with Leo VI, in 907 he was appointed to the patriarchate and held the post until his deposition shortly before or after Leo VI's death in 912.

== Life ==
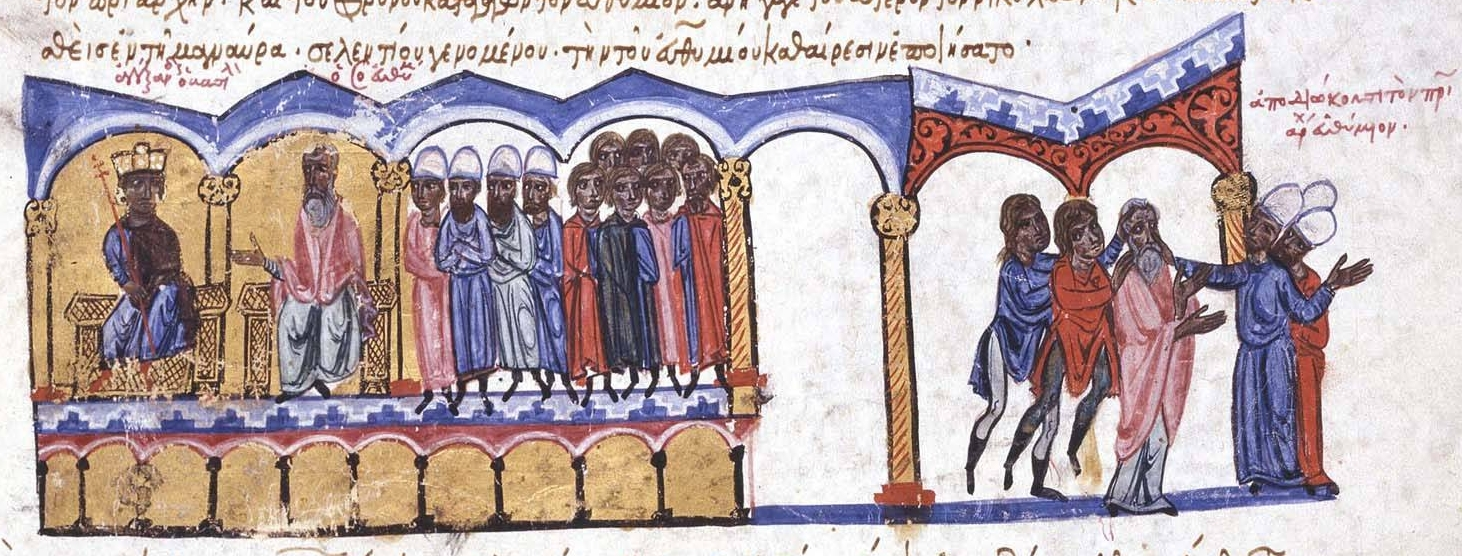
Emperor Alexander dismisses Euthymius I, miniature from the Madrid Skylitzes.

Euthymius was born in Seleucia in Isauria c. 834 and became a monk at an early age. According to his funeral oration, composed by Arethas of Caesarea, he was a relative of the "miracle-worker" Gregory of Dekapolis. Following stints at the monastic community of Mount Olympus and a monastery near Nicomedia, Euthymius came to the Byzantine capital, Constantinople, where he entered the monastery of St. Theodore, in the capital's outskirts. Euthymius had a relationship with the Patriarch Ignatius, whom he alludes to as his master, and it is probably during Ignatius' second tenure on the patriarchal throne (867–877) that he was appointed as the spiritual father of the prince Leo, the son (Note: Leo's mother, Eudokia Ingerina, was Emperor Basil I's second wife but also the mistress of his predecessor, Michael III (r. 842–867). Leo was born while Michael was still alive, which led to rumours, already current during the time, that he was actually Michael's son. Many modern scholars have led credence to the idea, especially in view of Leo VI's troubled relationship with Basil I. Whatever his biological parentage may have been, however, Leo was publicly and legally acknowledged as Basil's son. Tougher 1997, pp. 1, 42ff.) of Emperor Basil I (r. 867–886) and future emperor as Leo VI the Wise (r. 886–912). Indeed, the historian Shaun Tougher argues in his study of Leo's reign that Euthymius was possibly the spiritual father of all of Basil's sons. Euthymius supported Leo in his conflict with his father over his affair with Zoe Zaoutzaina. According to Euthymius I's hagiography, the Vita Euthymii, he helped Leo survive his imprisonment in 883–886, while the young prince constantly requested his advice, forcing him to stay in Constantinople rather than his monastery.

At the time of Basil I's death in 886, Euthymius was a monk in the monastery of the Theotokos of the Spring. With Leo's accession to the throne, Euthymius was rewarded by being appointed as abbot of a newly built monastery in the Psamathia quarter in Constantinople, built on land confiscated from the exiled Leo Katakalon. According to the Vita Euthymii, he accepted only after the emperor agreed to recall Katakalon from exile and restore to him the rest of his properties. The monastery was inaugurated on 6 May 889 or 890 in the presence of Leo and the latter's brother, Stephen, who since December 886 was Patriarch of Constantinople. At about the same time (according to P. Karlin-Hayter in late 888 or early 889) he was also named to the post of syncellus, succeeding Stephen, who had held the post in tandem with the patriarchate since 886. This was an important office in the Byzantine ecclesiastical hierarchy, and several of its holders had subsequently advanced to the patriarchate.

Despite his closeness to the new emperor, Euthymius I's relationship with Leo VI was "notoriously stormy" (Shaun Tougher), and perhaps explains why did not succeed to the patriarchal throne until 907. The Vita Euthymii also assigns much of the blame for Euthymius I's troubled relation with the emperor on the machinations of Zoe Zaoutzaina's father, Stylianos Zaoutzes. Zaoutzes' rivalry with Euthymius is a major theme of his hagiography, where the former is represented as an all-powerful minister whose ambitions and machinations are responsible for all errors and calamities of the reign, and with whom Euthymius I was engaged in a battle "for the prize of Leo's soul". How far Stylianos Zaoutzes' reported dominance reflects reality is questioned by Shan Tougher, who points out that from the historical sources, Leo does not seem to have simply followed Stylianos' initiative, but to have retained control of affairs throughout his reign. Euthymius I has also been seen by modern scholars as an advocate of the traditional aristocracy, and at odds with Leo VI's "foreign" (i.e. non-Byzantine Greek and non-aristocratic) advisers, such as the Armenian Stylianos Zaoutzes, the Arab eunuch chamberlain Samonas, or the Italian Nicholas I of Constantinople, who preceded Euthymius I on the patriarchal throne, although this probably has more to do with the obvious effort of the Vita to present Euthymius I as a perfect saint, which leads it to denigrate his rivals.

Euthymius I first incurred Leo VI's displeasure when he supported his first wife, Theophano Martinakia, and dissuaded her from seeking a divorce due to the emperor's neglect and his continued cohabitation with his long-time mistress Zoe Zaoutzaina. After Theophano's death, Euthymius I opposed Leo VI's second marriage to Zoe Zaoutzaina due to her ill repute, which earned him a two-year confinement in the monastery of St. Diomedes. He was not released until after Zoe's death two years later. Following Zoe's death after giving birth to a daughter, Anna, Leo pursued a — normally un-canonical — third marriage, to Eudokia Baïana, in hopes of having a male heir. Indeed, a boy named Basil was born in Easter 901, but Eudokia died during childbirth and was soon followed by the baby. This was once more the occasion of a clash between the emperor and Euthymius. The Vita asserts that following the death of Zoe and her father, as well as the discovery of a conspiracy by their relatives, Leo VI had repented of his treatment of Euthymius I and asked for his forgiveness. The emperor repeatedly sought his counsel, going as far as visiting him incognito at the monastery in Psamathia. During one of the visits, Euthymius prophesied Eudokia's death and later refused to attend her funeral, retiring with six followers from Constantinople to the suburb of "ta Agathou", a property of his monastery.

Undeterred, the emperor took a mistress, Zoe Karbonopsina, and in September 905 he was finally able to celebrate the birth of the future emperor Constantine VII. The fact that the child's mother was the emperor's mistress caused trouble with leading Church officials, and Leo VI was forced to promise to separate from Zoe as a precondition for the infant's ceremonial baptism by Patriarch Nicholas I in the Hagia Sophia. Euthymius too was persuaded to act as one of Constantine's godfathers in the ceremony, which took place in January 906. Despite his pledge to separate from Zoe, however, Leo now was determined to legitimize both her and their son by a fourth marriage, something utterly forbidden by canon law on pain of excommunication. Patriarch Nicholas I initially supported the emperor in his efforts to secure a grant of economy, but the Church leadership was vehemently opposed, forcing Nicholas I too to change sides. As the impasse continued, in February 907 Nicholas was dismissed by the emperor, and Euthymius was appointed in his stead. The Vita explains Nicholas I's stance and his final deposition by his implication in the abortive plot of general Andronikos Doukas, but other sources are silent as to the exact background of the affair.

Despite Euthymius I's notorious stubbornness, which probably had discouraged Leo VI from raising him to the patriarchate sooner, he proved willing to grant the emperor economy, aided by the assent of the other patriarchates of the Pentarchy. Despite Zoe's repeated efforts, however, he steadfastly refused to officially recognize her marriage with the emperor as canonical and her status as empress. Leo was forced to do penance to atone for his marriage and to pass a law excluding anyone from ever again marrying for a fourth time. As a result of the settlement, on 15 May 908 Euthymius I crowned the infant Constantine VII as co-emperor. Even though the later Byzantine chroniclers tend to side with Nicholas I against Leo VI, they paint Euthymius I in a favourable light. According to the Vita, his tenure helped heal the rift in the Church and reconcile many leading churchmen with the emperor's fourth marriage. Bishop Gabriel of Ancyra is even said to have sent the omophorion of Saint Clement as a gift and a token of appreciation.

Shortly before Leo VI's death in May 912, the emperor reconciled himself with Nicholas I, who now demanded his re-instatement as Patriarch. The sources are unclear, but shortly after Leo VI's death, or perhaps already before, Euthymius I was deposed by a synod convened at Magnaura in favour of Nicholas I, who was recalled from exile. Euthymius I was exiled to Agathou, where he died on 5 August 917.

== Hagiography and writings ==
Euthymius I's hagiography, the Vita Euthymii, or The Life of Euthymius, was apparently written in the years 920–925 according to P. Karlin-Hayter, or, according to D. Sophianos, soon after 932. Its author is unknown, but, in the words of Shaun Tougher, "he had an insider's perspective on court affairs during [Leo VI's] reign", and is consequently one of the "richest sources for the period from the death of Basil I to the early years of Constantine VII" (Alexander Kazhdan). However, despite offering a vivid portrait of Leo and his court, with eye-witness anecdotes that illustrate the emperor's character, as a source it is limited due to its focus on, and bias in favour of, Euthymius, as well as due to the fact that several sections are missing. The single surviving manuscript was kept in Berlin and vanished during World War II, but the Vita exists in several critical editions:

- de Boor, C. (1888). Vita Euthymii, Ein Anecdoton zur Geschichte Leos des Weisen (in German).
- Karlin-Hayter, P. (1955–1957). "Vita St. Euthymii". Byzantion. 25/27: 1–172, 747–778.
- Karlin-Hayter, P. (1971). Vita Euthymii Patriarchae CP - Text, translation, introduction and commentary. Bibliothèque de Byzantion. Vol. 3.
- Kazhdan, Alexander (1959). Две византийские хроники X века: Псамафийская хроника — Иоанн Камениата, Взятие Фессалоники (in Russian).
- Alexakis, A. (2006). Γάμοι, κηδεῖες καὶ αὐτοκρατορικὲς μεταμέλειες. Ὁ βίος τοῦ πατριάρχη Εὐθυμίου (in Greek). Athens: Kanakis. ISBN 960-7420-91-8.

Euthymius I's own writings are few and relatively insignificant, comprising sermons on the conception of Saint Anne and a homily on the Virgin Mary. His contemporary Arethas of Caesarea also wrote a panegyric in his honour, but according to Kazhdan "it is conventional and provides only limited data".

== Bibliography ==
- Kazhdan, Alexander (1991). "Euthymius". In Kazhdan, Alexander (ed.). The Oxford Dictionary of Byzantium. Oxford and New York: Oxford University Press. pp. 755–756. ISBN 0-19-504652-8.
- Krönung, Bettina (2010). "Life of Euthymius, patriarch of Constantinople". In Thomas, David; Mallett, Alex (eds.). Christian-Muslim Relations - A Bibliographical History, Volume 2 (900–1050). Leiden: Brill Publishers. pp. 192–195. ISBN 978-90-04-16976-0.
- Lilie, Ralph-Johannes; Ludwig, Claudia; Pratsch, Thomas; Zielke, Beate (2013). Prosopographie der mittelbyzantinischen Zeit Online. Berlin-Brandenburgische Akademie der Wissenschaften. Nach Vorarbeiten F. Winkelmanns erstellt (in German). Berlin and Boston: De Gruyter.
- Tougher, Shaun (1997). The Reign of Leo VI (886–912) - Politics and People. Leiden: Brill Publishers. ISBN 978-90-04-10811-0.

Titles of Chalcedonian Christianity
Preceded by Nicholas I	Ecumenical Patriarch of Constantinople; 907 – 912	Succeeded by Nicholas I
