= Anna of Constantinople (daughter of Leo VI) =

Byzantine princess

Anna of Constantinople was a late 9th century Byzantine princess, Augusta, and the daughter of Byzantine Emperor Leo VI. From the Macedonian dynasty, she married the Carolingian Emperor Louis the Blind, helping to establish greater diplomatic links between the East and West.

== Early life ==
=== Family ===
Anna was born c. 888 to Emperor Leo VI and his mistress Zoe Zaoutzaina, who was the daughter of Stylianos Zaoutzes, a high-ranking bureaucrat of Armenian origin. Her father had a complicated romantic life, and did not marry her mother until after Empress Theophano's death in 897. Her mother died in 899.

=== Augusta ===
According to Eastern Orthodox Canon Law, Anna's father was forbidden from marrying for a third time, so in 899, Anna was given the title of Augusta, an honor usually bestowed upon the wife of the emperor. The title carried with it great honor and respect, the Augusta would accompany the emperor to official ceremonies, and her presence was required to celebrate the liturgical holidays.

In 900 however, Anna was married to her betrothed, Louis the Blind, King of Provence, partly in an effort to strengthen diplomatic ties with the West.

== Marriage and Issue ==
With Louis the Blind, Anna had two children:

- Charles-Constantine, Count of Vienne
- Anna of Provence, wife of King Berengar I of Italy

== Death and Legacy ==
Anna died in 902, immediately after giving birth to her son Charles-Constantine.

She would be remembered as one of the earliest gateway ancestors between Western European royalty and the Macedonian dynasty of the Byzantine Empire.
