= Empress Zoe (disambiguation) =

Zoe Porphyrogenita (c. 978 – 1050) was Byzantine empress regnant in 1042.

Empress Zoe may also refer to:

- Zoe Zaoutzaina (died 899), the second wife of Byzantine emperor Leo VI.
- Zoe Karbonopsina, the fourth wife of Leo VI.
- Sophia Palaiologina, born Zoe Palaiologina, second wife of Ivan III of Russia, the first Grand Prince of Moscow to also claim the title Sovereign of all Russia and to use the title Tsar.
