= Syncellus (disambiguation) =

Syncellus or synkellos (Greek: σύγκελλος) is an ecclesiastical office in the Eastern Catholic or Orthodox Churches.

As part of a name, it can also refer to several people who bore this title:

- Euthymius I Syncellus, Byzantine ecclesiastic, Patriarch of Constantinople in 907–912
- George Syncellus, 9th-century Byzantine chronicler and ecclesiastic
- Michael Syncellus, 9th-century Byzantine saint

== See also ==
- Protosyncellus
