= Charles Constantine of Vienne =

Count of Vienne (died 962)

Charles Constantine
- Count of Vienne
- Died: 962
- Noble family: Bivinids (agnatic)
- Spouse: Thiberge de Troyes
- Issue: Richard; Hubert; Constance
- Father: Louis III the Blind
- Mother: Anna of Constantinople (disputed)

Charles-Constantine (died 962) was a Count of Vienne. His father, Louis the Blind, was King of Provence and Holy Roman Emperor.

== Life ==
When Charles' father Louis died in 929, Hugh of Arles, who was already king of Italy, took over Provence and gave it, in 933, to King Rudolf II of Burgundy. Charles-Constantine, for whatever reason, did not inherit the imperial throne or Provence. This has led many to believe he was, in fact, illegitimate. He was awarded the county of the Viennois in 931, by Rudolph of France.

He was married to Thiberge de Troyes. They had two sons and a daughter:

- Richard
- Hubert
- Constance of Vienne, married to Boson II count of Arles.

== Name and ancestry ==
This count appears simply as "Carolus" (Charles) in his own charters. Flodoard, writing his annals during the count's lifetime, called him Karolo Constantino Ludovici orbi filii (Charles Constantine, son of Louis the Blind), and this added byname also appears in the writings of 10th-century historian Richerus, who used Flodoard as a source. The implications of this byname, Constantine, have been subject to debate. Poole considered it a toponymic name of Flodoard's devising, reference to Arles (sometimes called Constantina urbs), but Previté-Orton sees in it a reference to his parentage. A surviving letter by Patriarch Nicholas I Mystikos testifies that Emperor Leo VI the Wise of Byzantium, father of Constantine VII, had betrothed his daughter to a Frank prince, a cousin of Bertha (of Tuscany), to whom came later a great misfortune. That unfortunate prince could only be Louis III, whose mother Ermengard of Italy was a first cousin of Bertha, and who was blinded on 21 July 905, while the prospective bride would have been Emperor Leo's only surviving daughter at that time, Anna of Constantinople, born to his second wife Zoe Zaoutzaina. Charles Constantine would thus have been given names reflecting his paternal and maternal imperial heritage. However, it is still questioned whether the planned marriage ever took place, and there are chronological difficulties (not insurmountable in the opinion of Previté-Orton) in making Anna the mother of Charles Constantine. Richerus suggested that the ancestry of Charles Constantine was tainted by illegitimacy back to five generations, although the meaning of this is disputed. Most of the scholars accept that Charles Constantine was Anna's son.

== Sources ==
- Dictionnaire de Biographie Française. Roman d'Amat and R. Limousin-Lamothe (ed). Paris, 1967.
