= Louis the Blind =

Emperor in Italy from 901 to 905

- Emperor of the Romans
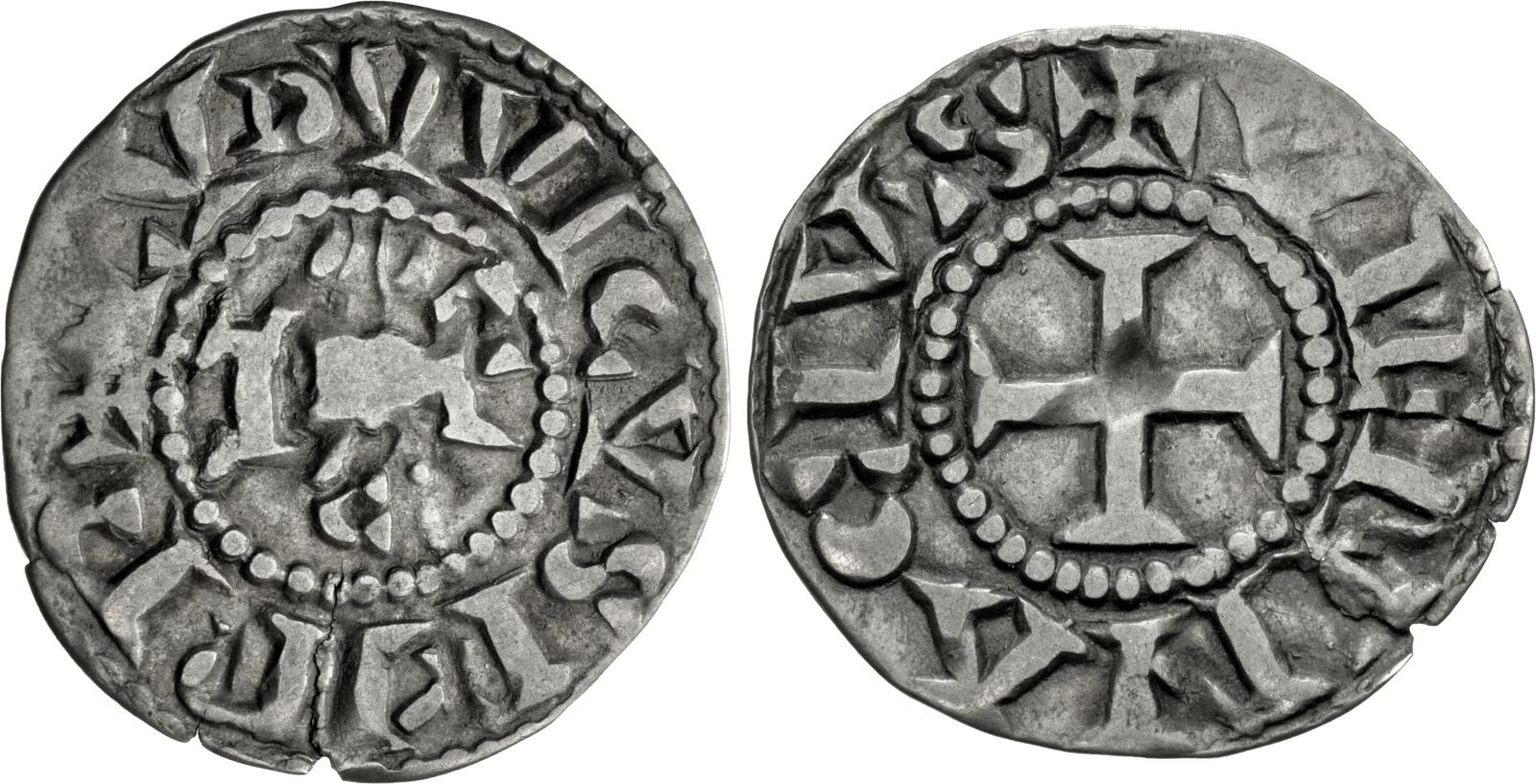
- French denier minted in the name of Louis III. Legend: ☩ lvdvvicvs imp(erator)

Emperor in Italy
- Reign: 901–905
- Coronation: February 901, Rome
- Predecessor: Arnulf
- Successor: Berengar I

King of Italy
- Reign: 900–905
- Predecessor: Arnulf
- Successor: Berengar I

King of Provence
- Reign: 890–928
- Predecessor: Boso
- Successor: Hugh
- Born: c. 880; Provence
- Died: 5 June 928 (aged c. 47/48); Vienne, Provence
- Spouses: Anna of Constantinople; Adelaide of Burgundy
- Issue: by Anna; Charles Constantine; Anna of Provence; by Adelaide; Rudolph
- House: Bivinid; Carolingian
- Father: Boso
- Mother: Ermengard
- Signum manus

Louis the Blind (c. 880 – 5 June 928) was king in Provence and Lower Burgundy from 890 to 928, and also king of Italy from 900 to 905, and also the emperor between 901 and 905, styled as Louis III. His father was king Boso, from the Bosonid family, and his mother was Ermengard, a Carolingian princess and only child of Emperor Louis II. In 905, he was blinded and lost Italy, retreating to his remaining domains in Provence and Lower Burgundy.

In historiography, he is styled as King of Provence, or King of Burgundy.

== Early reign ==
Partitions of the Carolingian Empire, after 887-890. Eastern Frankish Kingdom (king Arnulf, since 887) Western Frankish Kingdom (king Odo, since 888) Italy (rival kings Berengar I and Guy, since 888-889) Upper Burgundy (king Rudolph I, since 888) Lower Burgundy and Provence (king Louis, since 890)

Born c. 880, Louis was the son of Boso, the usurper king of Provence, and Ermengard, a daughter of Emperor Louis II. Upon Boso's death on 11 January 887, Louis was still a child, and under guardianship of his mother. Instead of unilaterally proclaiming her son as the new king in regions previously held or claimed by his father, she decided to improve Louis' claims, and thus approached her relative, the emperor Charles the Fat and declared Burgundy’s submission to the Empire. In May, Ermengard traveled to Charles' court with Louis, and received confirmation of family estates. Charles also adopted Louis, and put both mother and son under his protection.

However, in November 887, emperor Charles was deposed, and died in January 888, but Louis was still young and thus unable to claim royal dignity, while several other regional lords were proclaimed kings in 888: Rudolph I (in Upper Burgundy), Odo I (in West Francia) and Berengar I (in Italy). In May 889, Ermengard traveled to the court of king Arnulf of East Francia, to make a new submission, while at the same time seeking support of Pope Stephen V for her son. In August 890, at the Diet of Valence, a council of bishops and feudatories of the realm, after hearing the recommendation of the pope, and receiving notification of Charles the Fat's previous agreement to the proposition, proclaimed Louis as king in Lower Burgundy and Provence.

The short work Visio Karoli Grossi may have been written shortly after emperor Charles' death to support Louis's claims. If so, Louis must have had the support of Fulk the Venerable, Archbishop of Reims. On the other hand, the Visio may have been written later, circa 901, to celebrate (and support) Louis's later imperial coronation in 901.

His kingdom was smaller than his father's initial realm, as it did not include Upper Burgundy (lost to Rudolph I of Burgundy), nor any of West-Frankish Burgundy, absorbed by Richard the Justiciar, Duke of Burgundy. This meant that Louis' kingdom was restricted to the environs of Vienne and Provençal regions. Since he was still young, local barons elected Ermengard to act as his regent, with the support of Louis's uncle, Richard the Justiciar. In 894, Louis himself did homage to Arnulf.

In 896, Louis waged war on the Saracens. Throughout his reign he fought with these Saracen pirates, who had established a base at Fraxinet in 889 and had been raiding the coast of Provence, alarming the local nobility.

== Conflict with Berengar ==
In 900, Louis, as the grandson and heir of the Emperor Louis II, was invited into Italy by various lords, including Adalbert II, Margrave of Tuscany, who were suffering under the ravages of the Magyars and the incompetent rule of Berengar I. Louis thus marched his army across the Alps and defeated Berengar, chasing him from Pavia, the old Lombard capital, where, in the church of San Michele, he was crowned with the Iron Crown of Lombardy on 12 October 900. He travelled onwards to Rome, where, in 901, he was crowned emperor by Pope Benedict IV. However, his inability to stem the Magyar incursions and impose any meaningful control over northern Italy saw the Italian nobles quickly abandon his cause and once again align themselves with Berengar. In 902, Berengar defeated Louis's armies and forced him to flee to Provence and promise never to return.

In 905, Louis, after again listening to the Italian nobles who were tired of Berengar's rule, this time led by Adalbert I of Ivrea, launched another attempt to invade Italy. Once again throwing Berengar out of Pavia, he marched and also succeeded in taking Verona with only a small following, after receiving the promise of support from the bishop, Adalard. Partisans of Berengar in the town soon got word to Berengar of Louis's exposed position at Verona and his limited support. Berengar returned, accompanied by Bavarian troops, and entered Verona in the dead of night. Louis sought sanctuary at the church of St Peter, but he was captured. On 21 July 905, Louis had his eyes put out (for breaking his oath), and was forced to relinquish his royal Italian and imperial crowns. Later, Berengar became emperor. After this last attempt to restore his power over Italy, Louis continued to rule Provence for over twenty years, though his cousin Hugh, count of Arles, was the dominant figure in the territory.

Louis returned to Vienne, his capital, and by 911, he had put most of the royal powers in the hands of Hugh. Hugh was made Margrave of Provence and Marquis of Vienne and moved the capital to Arles. As regent, Hugh married Louis's sister Willa. Louis lived out his days until his death in obscurity, and through his life he continued to style himself as Roman emperor. He was succeeded by his brother-in-law in 928.

== Marriages and heirs ==
In 899, Louis III was betrothed to Anna of Constantinople, the daughter of Byzantine Emperor Leo VI the Wise and his second wife, Zoe Zaoutzaina. The evidence for this is a letter by Patriarch Nicholas Mystikos in which he testifies that Leo VI had united his daughter to a Frank prince, a cousin of Bertha, to whom came later a great misfortune. That unfortunate prince could only be Louis III, whose mother Irmingardis was a first cousin of Bertha and who was blinded on 21 July 905. This betrothal occurred shortly before the fall of Taormina to the Arabs, and was part of extended diplomatic activities meant to strengthen Byzantine alliances with the western powers to preserve Byzantine territory in southern Italy.

The question of whether the betrothal was ever followed up by an actual marriage is still a matter of some controversy. Louis fathered a son called Charles-Constantine, who would become Count of Vienne. Charles' mother is not named in any sources. There has been modern speculation, proposed by Previté-Orton and championed by Christian Settipani, that she was Anna,the daughter of Leo VI and Zoe Zaoutzaina, based both upon the documented betrothal, as well on the onomastic evidence, stating that Charles-Constantine's name points to a Byzantine mother. Shaun Tougher doubts they were ever married.

Detractors of the theory point out that when Anna was born, however, she was the daughter of a concubine who later became empress. Her father, at the time of Charles' birth, was the reigning emperor, therefore the silence of primary sources works against this theory. In addition, Liutprand of Cremona makes no mention of this, and it would have been very interesting to him, given that he was a thorough gossip, had been ambassador to Constantinople and devoted several chapters to the misadventures of Louis in Italy with no mention of these Byzantine connections. René Poupardin believed that Constantine was not a baptismal name, but Settipani disagrees. Richer specifically stated that Charles' ancestry was tainted with illegitimacy and mentioned nothing of his mother's supposed illustrious Byzantine parentage.

Christian Settipani challenges that theory by stating that the only reason why René Poupardin made him a bastard of Louis III was a passage by Richerius claiming that "Charles Constantine (...) was from a royal race, but which nobility had been vilified by a bastard ancestry remounting to his great-great-grandfather", proving nothing about Charles-Constantine's mother. Such a union would also account for the mention of Greek merchants in Louis’ privilege of 921.

In 914, Louis entered a second union, which would then be either his first or second marriage, by marrying Adelaide, daughter of Rudolph I of Upper Burgundy, likely mother of Rudolph, the other documented son of Louis the Blind.

In December 915, his daughter, Anna of Provence, married Berengar. It has been suggested, largely for onomastic reasons, that Anna was a daughter of Louis III and his wife Anna, daughter of Leo VI the Wise. In that case, she would have been betrothed to Berengar while still a child and only become his consors and imperatrix in 923.

== Sources ==
- Balzaretti, Ross (2016). "Narratives of success and narratives of failure: Representations of the career of King Hugh of Italy (c. 885–948)". Early Medieval Europe. 24 (2): 185–208. doi:10.1111/emed.12140.
- Bouchard, Constance B. (1988). "The Bosonids or Rising to Power in the Late Carolingian Age". French Historical Studies. 15 (3): 407–431. doi:10.2307/286367. JSTOR 286367. Archived from the original on 16 May 2025.
- Bouchard, Constance B. (1999). "Burgundy and Provence, 879–1032". The New Cambridge Medieval History. Vol. 3. Cambridge: Cambridge University Press. pp. 328–345. ISBN 978-0-521-36447-8.
- Duckett, Eleanor (1968). Death and Life in the Tenth Century. Ann Arbor: University of Michigan Press.
- Grierson, Philip; Blackburn, Mark (1986). Medieval European Coinage. Vol. 1, The Early Middle Ages (5th–10th Centuries). Cambridge University Press.
- MacLean, Simon (2001). "The Carolingian response to the revolt of Boso, 879–887". French Historical Studies. 10 (1): 21–48. doi:10.1111/1468-0254.00078. Archived from the original on 16 February 2025.
- MacLean, Simon (2003). Kingship and Politics in the Late Ninth Century: Charles the Fat and the end of the Carolingian Empire. New York: Cambridge University Press. ISBN 978-1-139-44029-5.
- Mann, Horace K. (1925). The Lives of the Popes in the Early Middle Ages. Vol. IV: The Popes in the Days of Feudal Anarchy, 891–999. Kegan Paul, Trench, Trubner & Co, Ltd.
- McKitterick, Rosamond (1983). The Frankish Kingdoms Under the Carolingians, 751-987. Harlow: Longman. ISBN 978-0-582-49005-5.
- Previté-Orton, Charles W. (1914). "Charles Constantine of Vienne". The English Historical Review. 29 (116): 703–706. JSTOR 551414.
- Previté-Orton, Charles W. (1917). "Italy and Provence, 900-950". The English Historical Review. 32 (127): 335–347. doi:10.1093/ehr/XXXII.CXXVII.335. JSTOR 551042. Archived from the original on 20 December 2016.
- Riché, Pierre (1993). The Carolingians: A Family Who Forged Europe. Philadelphia: University of Pennsylvania Press. ISBN 0-8122-1342-4.
- Rosenwein, Barbara H. (1996). "The Family Politics of Berengar I, King of Italy (888–924)". Speculum. 71 (2): 247–289. doi:10.2307/2865414. JSTOR 2865414. Archived from the original on 31 May 2025.
- Wickham, Chris (1981). Early Medieval Italy: Central Power and Local Society, 400-1000. Totowa, NJ: Barnes & Noble. ISBN 978-0-389-20217-2.

Louis the Blind Bosonid dynasty Died: 5 June 928
Regnal titles
Preceded by Boso	King of Provence; 890–928	Succeeded by Hugh
Preceded by Berengar I	— DISPUTED — King of Italy; 900–905; Disputed by Berengar I	Succeeded by Berengar I
Preceded by Arnulf	— DISPUTED — (Holy) Roman Emperor; 901–905; Disputed by Berengar I	Succeeded by Berengar I
