= Leo Scepter =

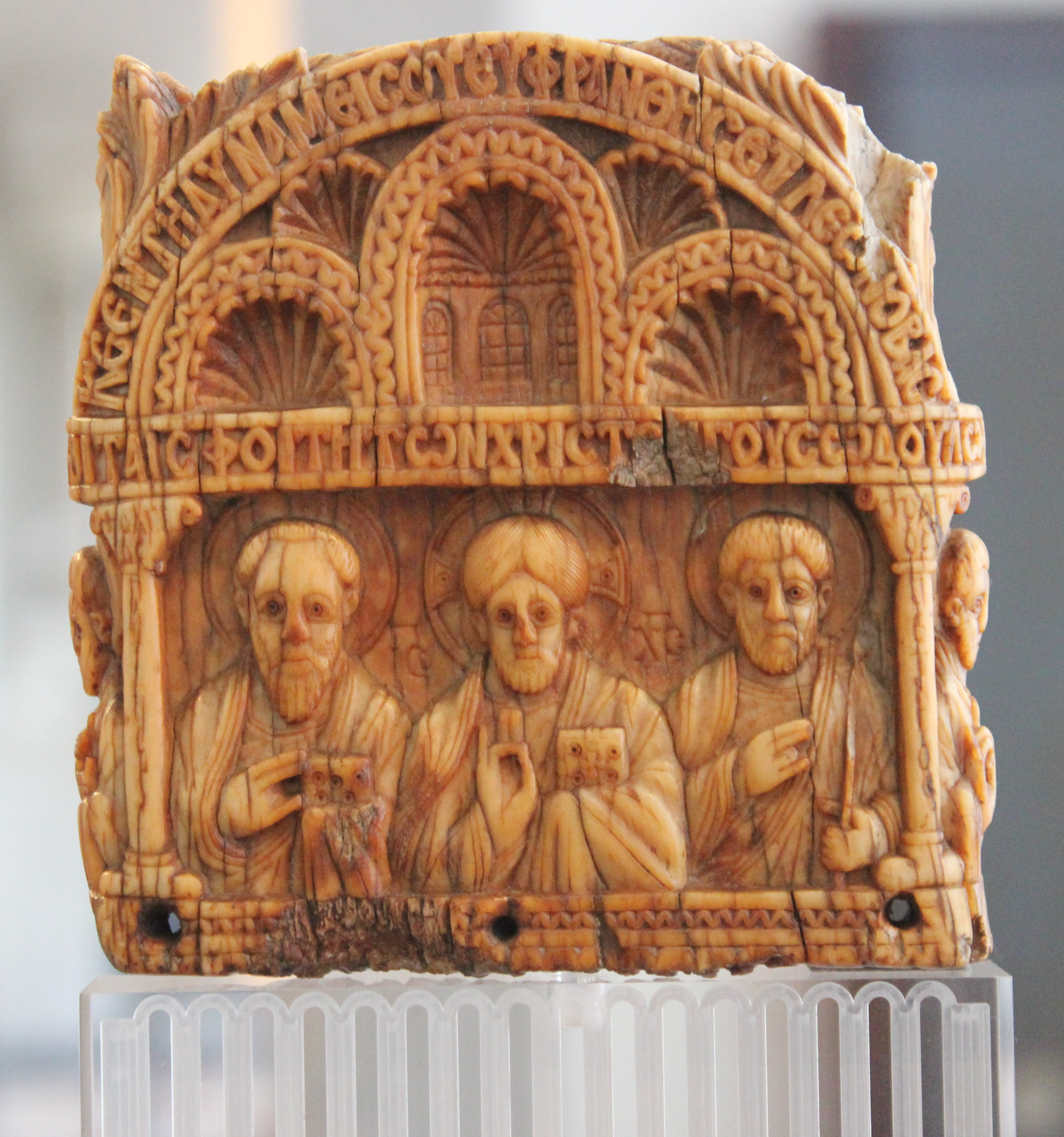
Christ between St. Peter and St. Paul

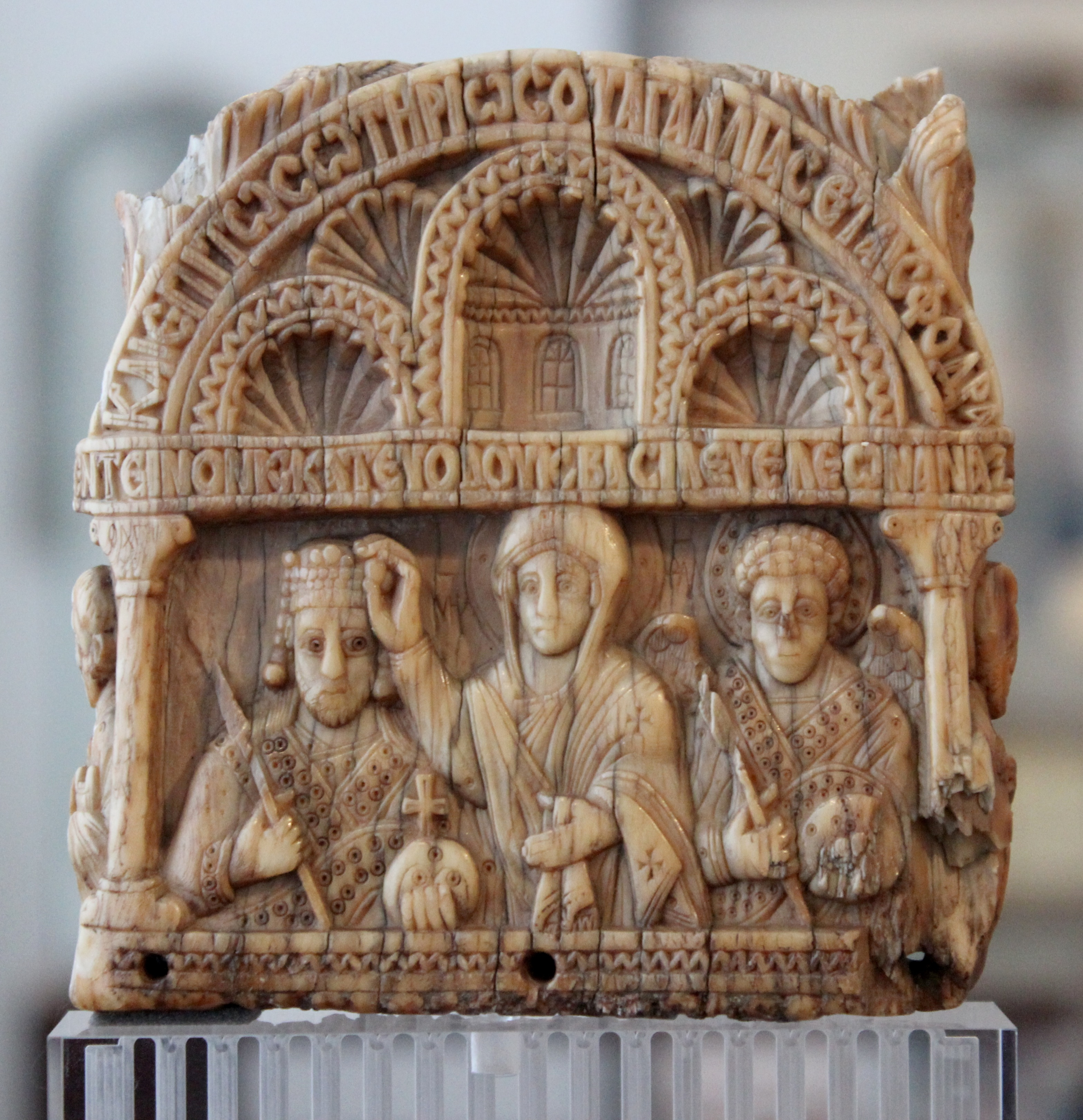
The Virgin crowning an Emperor, assisted by the archangel Gabriel

The Leo Scepter is a Byzantine ivory work of art, usually and erroneously identified as a scepter tip. Generally accepted to be from the 9th century, the piece is now part of the collection of the Berlin State Museums. It must be added that the date and identification of this ivory, although probable, are not indisputable. Various historians have suggested that the piece, carved with religious iconographies and inscriptions, such as the name of an Emperor Leo, had been made during the reign of Leo VI the Wise (r. 886–912– ), and was probably handled in public ceremonies as a symbol of imperial and religious authority. Kurt Weitzmann on the other hand proposed that this ivory may have been made during the reign of Leo V the Armenian (r. 813–820– ). However, a recent analysis of the content of its inscriptions has shown that the connection with the coronation of Leo V is unjustified.

== Original function ==
Scholars have argued about the original function of this ivory, whether it was the tip of a scepter, or the grip on the lid of a casket containing a crown. However, recent scholars have argued that the ivory was in fact a ceremonial comb made probably for the Emperor Leo VI.

== Significance ==
The Leo Ivory is the largest known ivory work of art made under the Macedonian Renaissance. It measures 10.2 x 10.0 x 2.1 centimeters, and it is carved in all four sides. The piece contains a dowel hole measuring 3.2 centimeters into its base, which some experts have suggested was perhaps attached to something else, and was designed to be handled.

== Manufacture ==
While references in Byzantine texts to ivory after the sixth century are few, various historians have suggested that early Christian ivories such as the ivory plaque with the coronation of Emperor Leo VI's son, Constantine VII Prophyrogenitos, were made in an urgent effort to erase their peasant origins from the public memory, to legitimate the power of the Macedonian dynasty, and to communicate to the Byzantine society the ideology that their kingship was the will of God. The scarcity of ivory in the area, and its significance in the art of the Byzantine Empire and Church certainly encouraged its production.

== Physical description ==
The iconography carved in the front of the comb represents Christ in the center, surrounded by St. Peter on his left and St. Paul on his right. The iconography on the back represents the Virgin Mary crowning an Emperor, probably Leo VI, and assisted by the angel Gabriel. By this image of coronation, various experts have suggested the explicit willingness to show the divine approval of the imperial power on earth. Others have suggested that the ceremonial comb was made perhaps in order to celebrate the coronation of the Emperor Leo VI. However, due to the significance of the Psalms in the Byzantine liturgy of Pentecost, the three inscriptions bearing the Psalms 20 and 44 suggest that the comb was made perhaps for the celebration of Pentecost. The arches, niches, and windows carved on the ivory suggest a striking resemblance with the interior architecture of the east end of the Hagia Sophia cathedral.
