= Basileopator =

One of the highest titles of Byzantine Empire

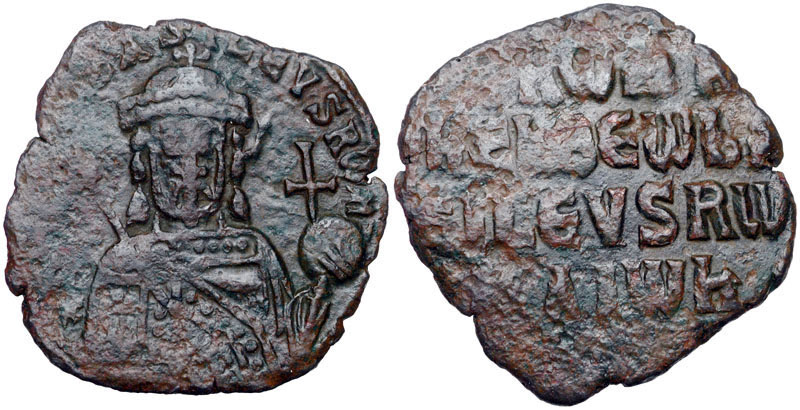
Bronze follis of Romanos Lekapenos, one of the three basileopatores in Byzantine history.

Basileopatōr (Greek: βασιλεοπάτωρ, lit. 'father of the basileus [emperor]') was one of the highest secular titles of the Byzantine Empire. It was an exceptional post (the 899 Kletorologion of Philotheos lists it as one of the 'special dignities', axiai eidikai), and conferred only three times in the Empire's history.

Its holder was not the emperor's biological father, and although the exact functions associated with the post remain obscure, it is generally hypothesized that it was meant to denote a regent acting as a custodian and tutor over a young emperor. A different interpretation, however, has been offered by A. Schmink, whereby the alternative spelling basileiopatōr (βασιλειοπάτωρ), found both in contemporary seals and in the Life of Theophano hagiography, ought to be preferred. The title could then be interpreted as meaning 'father of the palace', confirming the holder's position as the emperor's chief aide without implying any sort of tutelage over him.

The title was created, sometime between August 891 and May 893, by Emperor Leo VI the Wise (r. 886–912) for Stylianos Zaoutzes, the father of Leo's long-time mistress and later second wife, Zoe Zaoutzaina. Coming in addition to Stylianos's earlier title of magistros and the position of logothetēs tou dromou, by this act Leo, according to the traditional interpretation, is held to have formally placed the affairs of the Byzantine Empire in Zaoutzes's hands until the latter's death in 899. More recent scholarship, however, has cast doubt on the image of the "all-powerful basileopatōr" (Shaun Tougher), citing evidence in support of Leo's effective control of the government. Either way, the title placed Stylianos at the apex of the civil bureaucracy, directly below the emperor himself.

The title was revived in April 919 for admiral Romanos Lekapenos after he married his daughter Helena to Emperor Constantine VII (r. 913–959), but within a few months he was raised further to Caesar and, shortly after, was crowned senior emperor, with Constantine VII relegated to co-emperor.

The last known basileopatōr, the Caesar John Doukas held the post during the reign of either his nephew Michael VII Doukas (1071 – 1078) or his great-nephew Constantine Doukas' co-reign with Alexios I Komnenos (1081 – 1087).

The title was not used thereafter except in a literary context; Symeon Metaphrastes for instance anachronistically calls Arsenius the Great a basileopatōr, as he was the tutor of Honorius and Arcadius, the sons of Emperor Theodosius I (r. 379–395). There was also an attempt by supporters of Michael Palaiologos (r. 1259–1282) to revive the title in 1258, when he was appointed regent over the underage Nicaean emperor John IV Laskaris (r. 1258–1261), but instead, he assumed the titles of megas doux, then despotēs, before finally being crowned emperor in 1259.

== Sources ==
- Bury, J. B. (1911). The Imperial Administrative System of the Ninth Century – With a Revised Text of the Kletorologion of Philotheos. London: Oxford University Press. OCLC 1046639111.
- Gkoutzioukostas, Andreas (2014), "The dignity of basile(i)opator", in W. Brandes; L. M. Hoffmann; K. Maksimovič (eds.), Fontes Minores XII, pp. 205–233
- Kazhdan, Alexander, ed. (1991). The Oxford Dictionary of Byzantium. Oxford and New York: Oxford University Press. ISBN 0-19-504652-8.
- Tougher, Shaun (1997). The Reign of Leo VI (886-912): Politics and People. Leiden: Brill. ISBN 978-90-04-10811-0.
