= Zoe Karbonopsina =

Byzantine empress from 906 to 912

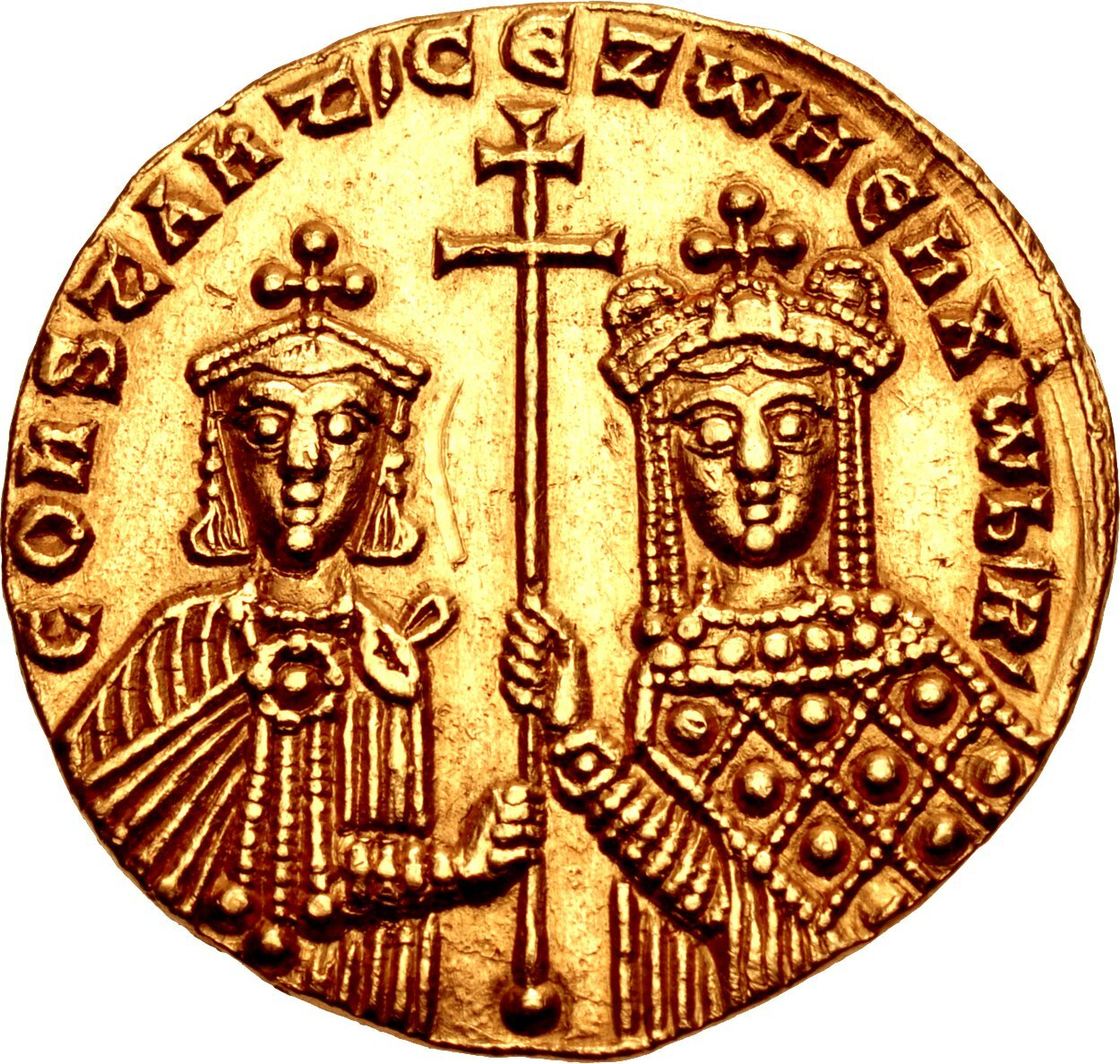
- Zoe and her son, emperor Constantine VII. Solidus minted during Zoe's regency, 913–919

Byzantine empress
- Tenure: 9 January 906 – 11 May 912
- Died: Sometime after 919
- Burial: Monastery of St. Euphemia, Constantinople (modern-day Istanbul, Turkey)
- Spouse: Leo VI the Wise
- Issue: Anna; Constantine VII
- Dynasty: Macedonian
- Religion: Chalcedonian Christianity

Zoe Karbonopsina, also Karvounopsina or Carbonopsina, lit. 'with the Coal-Black Eyes' (Greek: Ζωὴ Καρβωνοψίνα, romanized: Zōē Karbōnopsina), was an empress and regent of the Byzantine Empire. She was the fourth spouse of the Byzantine Emperor Leo VI the Wise and the mother of Constantine VII, serving as his regent from 913 until 919.

== Early life ==
Zoe Karbonopsina was born into a Greek family. She was a relative of the chronicler Theophanes the Confessor and a niece-in-law or sister-in-law of the admiral Himerios.

== Empress ==
Zoe was a mistress of Leo VI; they married on 9 January 906, after she had given birth to the future Constantine VII at the end of 905. Some have speculated that this marriage may have been influenced by Leo VI's desire for a son, while others have suggested he may have been driven to marry due to religious feelings of guilt after he had made laws promoting marriage as an important institution.

In any case, this was Leo VI's fourth marriage and was therefore un-canonical in the eyes of the Eastern Orthodox Church, which had already been reluctant to accept his third marriage to Eudokia Baïana, who died in childbirth in 901.

Although the Patriarch Nicholas Mystikos reluctantly baptized Constantine, he forbade the emperor from marrying for the fourth time. Leo VI married Zoe with the assistance of a cooperative priest, Thomas, but Nicholas' continued opposition to the marriage led to his removal from office and replacement by Euthymios in 907. The new patriarch attempted a compromise by defrocking the offending priest but recognizing the marriage.

== Regency ==
When Leo died in 912, he was succeeded by his younger brother Alexander, who recalled Nicholas Mystikos and expelled Zoe from the palace. Shortly before his death, Alexander provoked a war with Bulgaria. Zoe returned upon Alexander's death in 913, but Nicholas forced her to enter the convent of St. Euphemia in Constantinople after obtaining the promise of the senate and the clergy not to accept her as empress. However, Nicholas' unpopular concessions to the Bulgarians later in the same year weakened his position and in 914 Zoe was able to overthrow Nicholas and replace him as regent. Nicholas was allowed to remain patriarch after reluctantly recognizing her as empress. After that, the empire was ruled in the name of "Constantine and Zoe", but it was temporarily governed solely by Zoe due to Constantine’s minority.

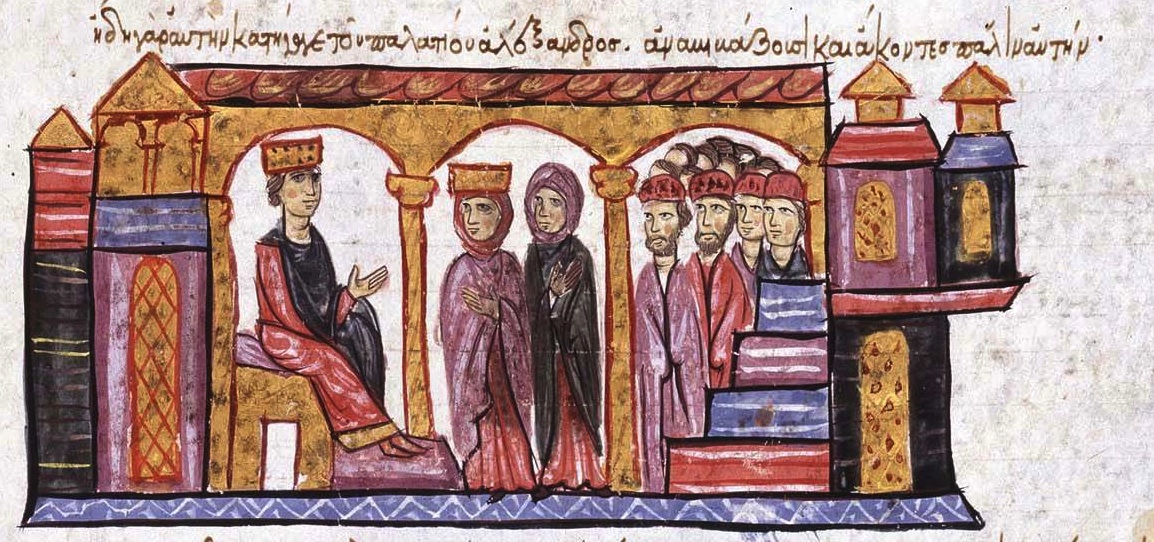
Constantine VII recalls his mother from exile.

Zoe governed with the support of imperial bureaucrats and the influential general Leo Phokas the Elder, who was her favorite. Zoe's first order of business was to revoke the concessions to Simeon I of Bulgaria, including the recognition of his imperial title and the arranged marriage between his daughter and Constantine VII. This renewed the war with Bulgaria, which began badly for the Byzantines who were distracted by military operations in Southern Italy and on the eastern frontier. In 915 Zoe's troops defeated an Arab invasion of Armenia, and made peace with the Arabs. This freed her hands to organize a major expedition against the Bulgarians, who had raided deep into Byzantine Thrace and captured Adrianople. The campaign was planned on a grand scale and intended the bribing and transportation of Pechenegs into Bulgaria by the imperial fleet from the north.

However, the Pecheneg alliance failed, and Leo Phokas was crushingly defeated in the Battle of Anchialus and again at the Battle of Katasyrtai, both in 917. Zoe tried to ally with Serbia and the Magyars against Simeon. This also failed to produce any concrete results, and the Arabs, encouraged by the empire's weakness, renewed their raids. A humiliating treaty with the Emirate of Sicily, who were asked to help subdue revolts in Italy, did little to improve the position of Zoe and her supporters.

== Later life ==
In 919, there was a coup involving various factions, but the opposition to Zoe and Leo Phokas prevailed; in the end the admiral Romanos Lekapenos took power, married his daughter Helena Lekapene to Constantine VII, and forced Zoe back into the convent of Euphemia.

Royal titles
Preceded by Eudokia Baïana	Byzantine Empress consort 906–912	Succeeded by Helena Lekapene
