= Leo VI the Wise =

Byzantine emperor from 886 to 912

Leo VI
- Emperor and Autocrat of the Romans
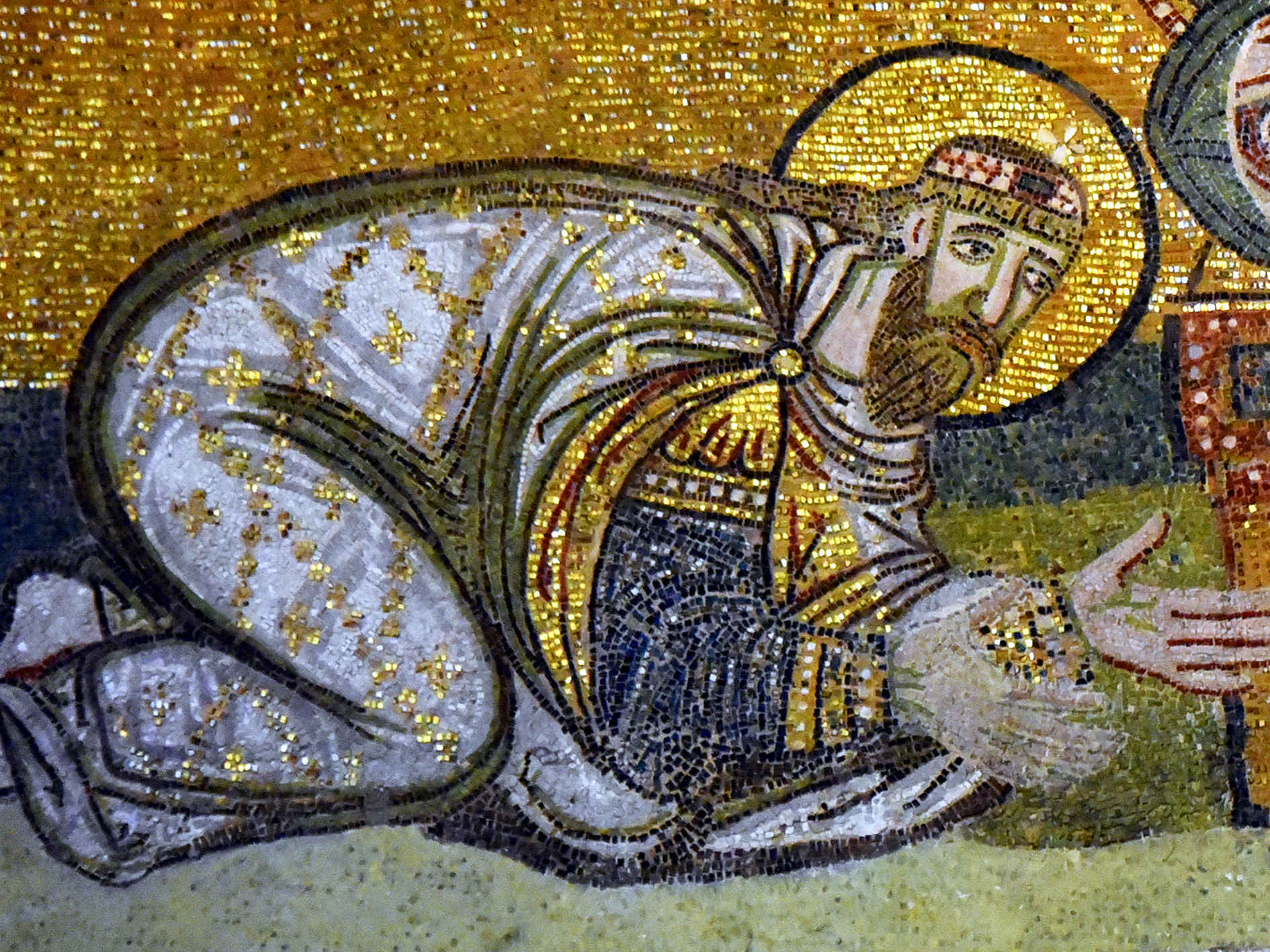
- A mosaic in Hagia Sophia showing Leo VI paying homage to Christ

Byzantine emperor
- Reign: 29 August 886 – 11 May 912
- Coronation: 6 January 870
- Predecessor: Basil I
- Successor: Alexander
- Co-emperors: Basil I (870–886); Constantine (870–879); Alexander (879–912); Constantine VII (908–912)
- Born: 19 September 866; Constantinople
- Died: 11 May 912 (aged 45); Constantinople
- Burial: Church of the Holy Apostles, Constantinople
- Wives: Theophano Martinakia; Zoe Zaoutzaina; Eudokia Baïana; Zoe Karbonopsina
- Issue: by Theophano; Eudokia by Zoe Zaoutzaina; Anna of Constantinople by Eudokia; Basil by Zoe Karbonopsina; Anna; Constantine VII
Regnal name
- Ancient Greek: Αὐτοκράτωρ Καῖσαρ Φλάβιος Λέων Αὐγουστος, romanized: Autokrátōr Kaîsar Phlā́bĭos Léōn Aúgoustos (Note: Leo VI is the last Byzantine emperor recorded as using the traditional Roman regnal name. Full title as attested in his Novel Constitutions: Αὐτοκράτωρ καῖσαρ Φλάβιος Λέων εὐσεβής, εὐτυχής, ἔνδοξος, νικητής, τροπαιοῦχος, ἀεισέβαστος αὐγουστος, πιστός βασιλεύς ("Autocrator Caesar Flavius Leo pious, fortunate, renowned, victorious, triumphant, ever-venerable, Augustus, faithful basileus").)
- Dynasty: Macedonian
- Father: Basil I (officially); Michael III (reputed, illegitimate)
- Mother: Eudokia Ingerina
- Religion: Greek Orthodox

Leo VI, also known as Leo the Wise (Greek: Λέων ὁ Σοφός, romanized: Léōn ō Sophós; 19 September 866 – 11 May 912), was Byzantine emperor from 886 to 912. The second ruler of the Macedonian dynasty (although his parentage is unclear), he was reportedly very well read, leading to his epithet. During his reign, the renaissance of letters, begun by his predecessor Basil I, continued; but the empire also saw several military defeats in the Balkans against Bulgaria and against the Arabs in Sicily and the Aegean. His reign also witnessed the formal discontinuation of several ancient Roman institutions, such as the separate office of Roman consul.

== Early life ==
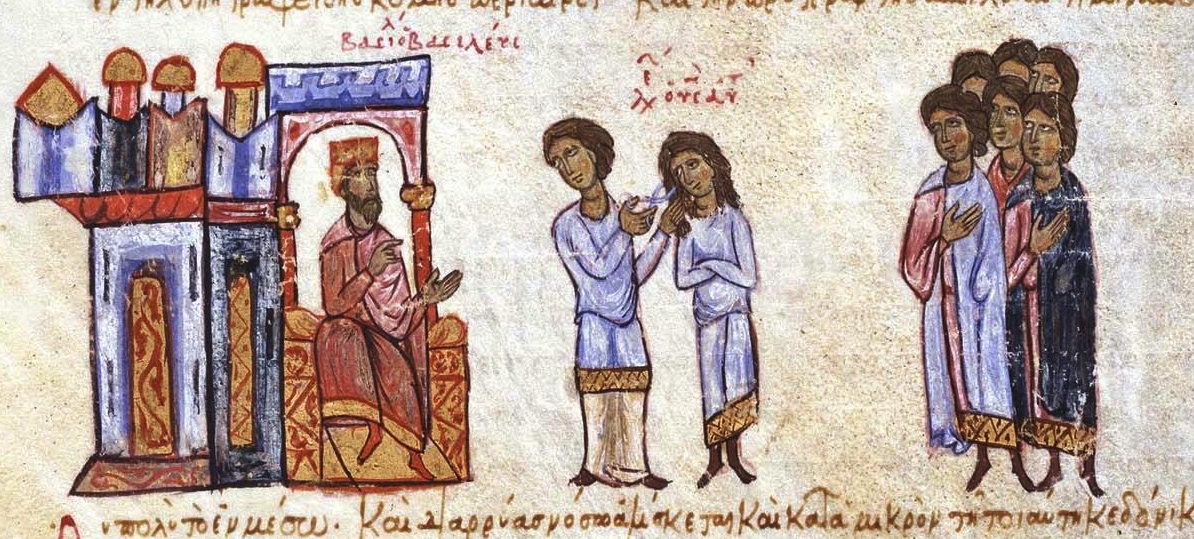
Leo VI (center) and Basil I (left), from the 12th-century manuscript by John Skylitzes

Born on 19 September 866 to the empress Eudokia Ingerina, Leo was either the illegitimate son of Emperor Michael III or the second son of Michael's successor, Basil I the Macedonian. Eudokia was both Michael III's mistress and Basil's wife. In 867, Michael was assassinated by Basil, who succeeded him as emperor. As the second-eldest son of the Emperor, Leo was associated on the throne in 870 and became the direct heir on the death of his older half-brother Constantine in 879. However, Leo and Basil did not like each other; a relationship that only deteriorated after Eudokia's death, when Leo, unhappy with his marriage to Theophano, took up a mistress in the person of Zoe Zaoutzaina. Basil had married Zoe off to an insignificant official, and later almost had Leo blinded when he was accused of conspiring against him. On 29 August 886, Basil died in a hunting accident, though he claimed on his deathbed that there was an assassination attempt in which Leo was possibly involved.

== Domestic policy ==
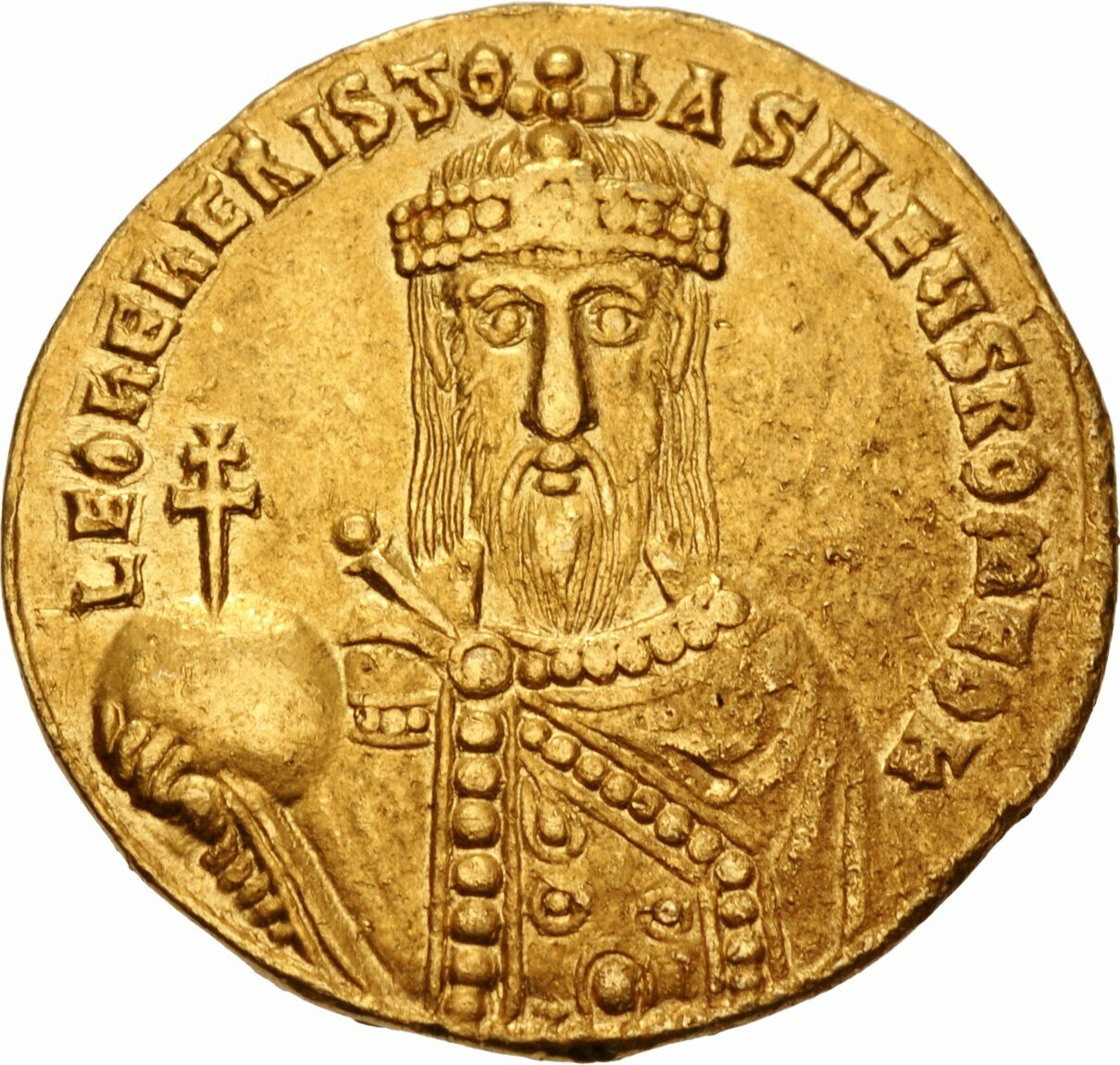
Gold solidus of Leo VI.

As one of Leo VI's first actions after his succession, the remains of Michael III were reburied, with great ceremony, in the imperial mausoleum within the Church of the Holy Apostles. This contributed to the suspicion that Leo was (or at least believed himself to be) in truth Michael's son. Seeking political reconciliation, the new emperor secured the support of the officials in the capital, and surrounded himself with bureaucrats like Stylianos Zaoutzes (the father of his mistress, Zoe Zaoutzaina) and the eunuch Samonas, an Arab defector whom Leo raised to the rank of patrikios and who stood in as godfather to Leo's son, Constantine VII. His attempts to control the great aristocratic families (e.g., the Phokadai and the Doukai) occasionally led to serious conflicts, the most significant being the revolt of Andronikos Doukas in 906.

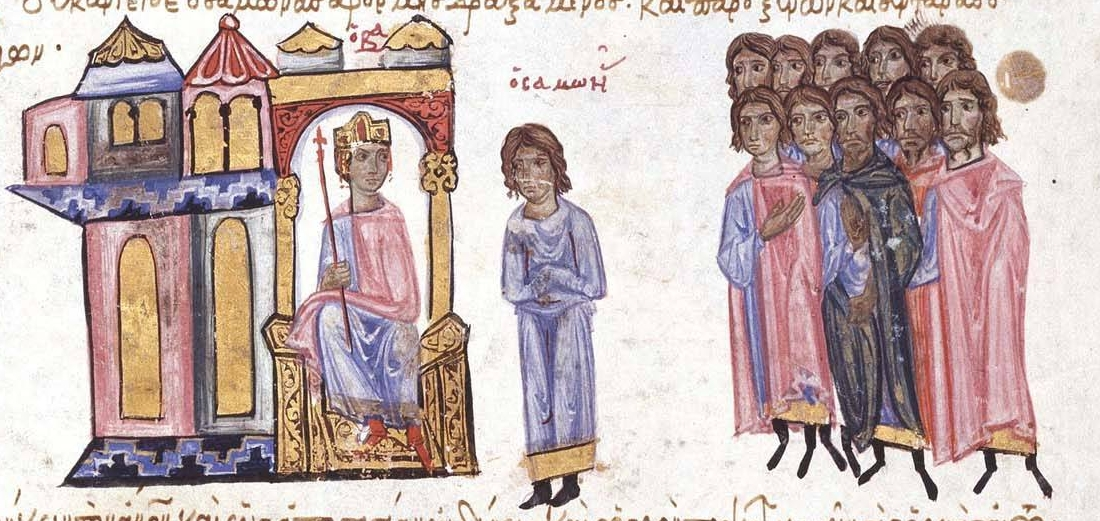
Samonas inciting Emperor Leo against Andronikos Doukas.

Leo also attempted to involve himself in the church through his arbitrary interference with the patriarchate. Using his former tutor Patriarch Photios's excommunication by Pope John VIII as an excuse, Leo dismissed him and replaced him with his own 19-year-old brother Stephen in December 886. On Stephen's death in 893, Leo replaced him with Zaoutzes' nominee, Antony II Kauleas, who died in 901. Leo then promoted his own Imperial secretary (mystikos) Nicholas, but suspicions that he was involved in the failed assassination attempt against Leo in 903 as well as his opposition to Leo's fourth marriage saw Nicholas replaced with Leo's spiritual father Euthymios in 907.

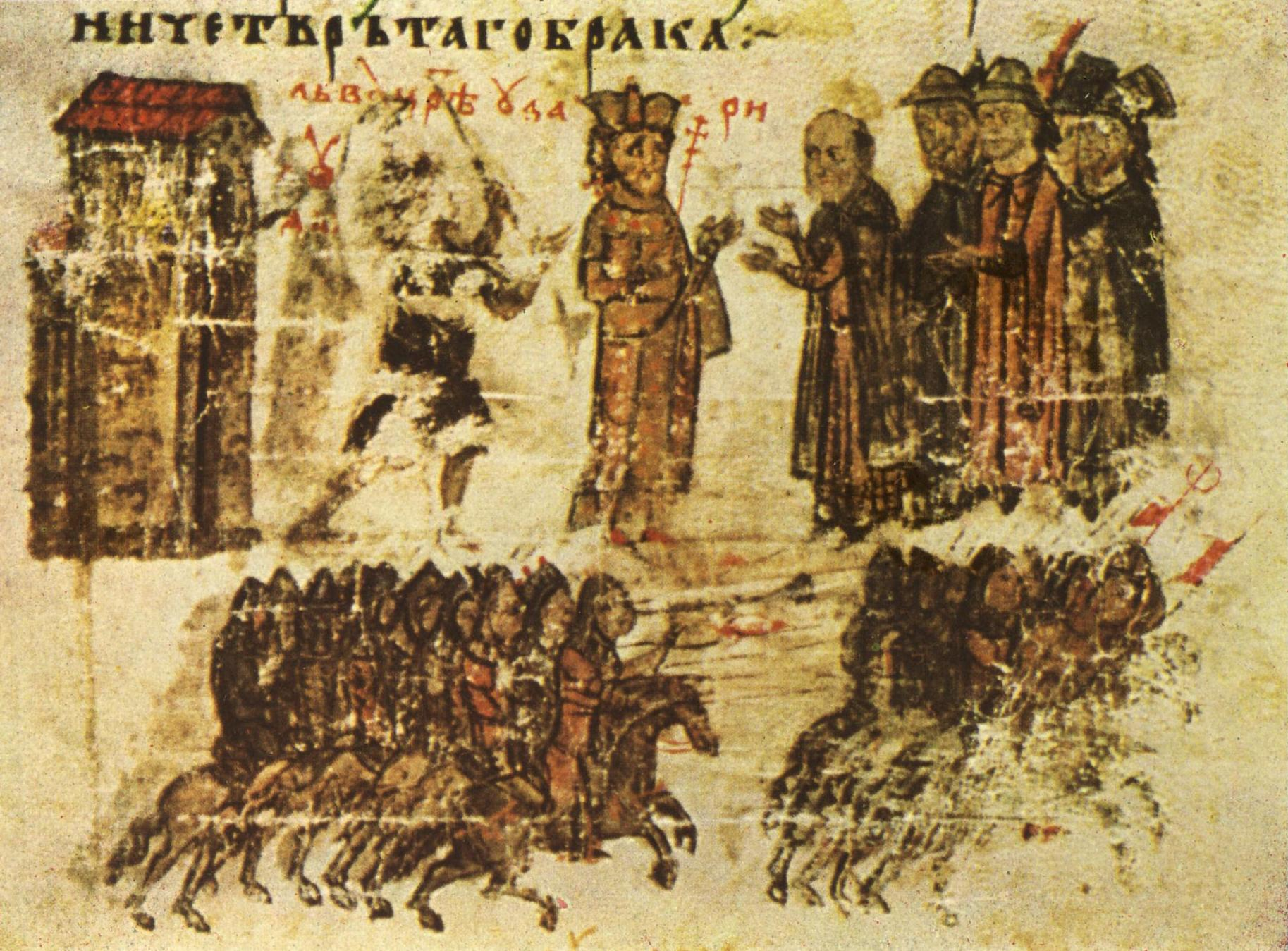
An assassination attempt on Leo VI and a Magyar raid depicted in the 14th century Manasses Chronicle.

The magnificent Church of Agios Lazaros in Larnaca was constructed during the rule of Leo VI in the late 9th century, after the relics of St. Lazaros were transported from Crete to Constantinople. The church is one of the best examples of Byzantine architecture. Leo also completed work on the Basilika, the Greek translation and update of the law code issued by Justinian I, which had been started during the reign of Basil.

Bishop Liutprand of Cremona gives an account similar to those about Caliph Harun al-Rashid, to the effect that Leo would sometimes disguise himself and go about Constantinople looking for injustice or corruption. According to one story, three separate patrols of city guards stopped him as a suspicious character during one of his investigations. The first two let him pass in exchange for bribes of 12 nomismata apiece, but the third arrested him. A terrified jailer recognized and released Leo the next morning. The emperor rewarded the arresting officer for doing his duty, while the other patrols were dismissed and punished severely.

== Foreign policy ==
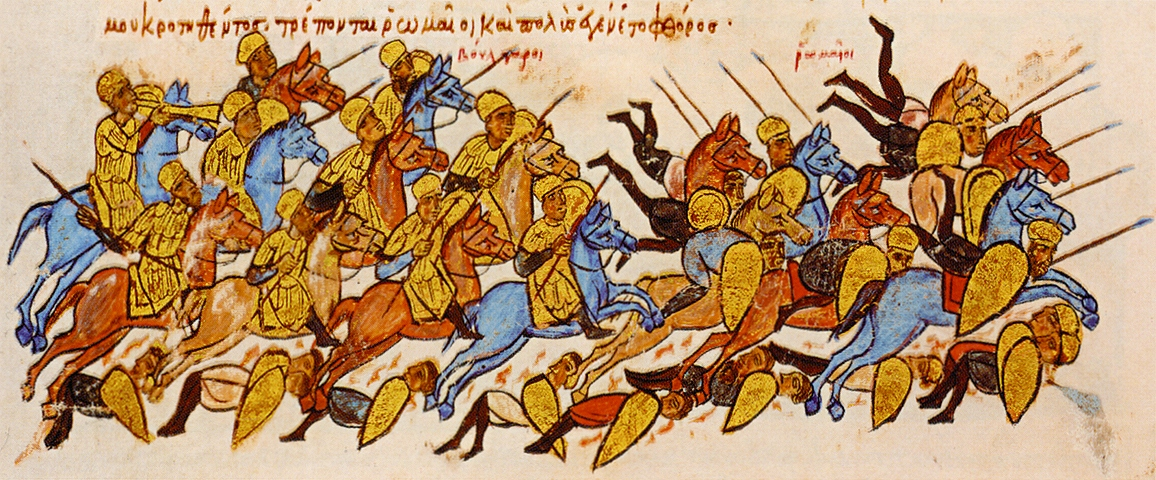
The Byzantines flee at Boulgarophygon, miniature from the Madrid Skylitzes

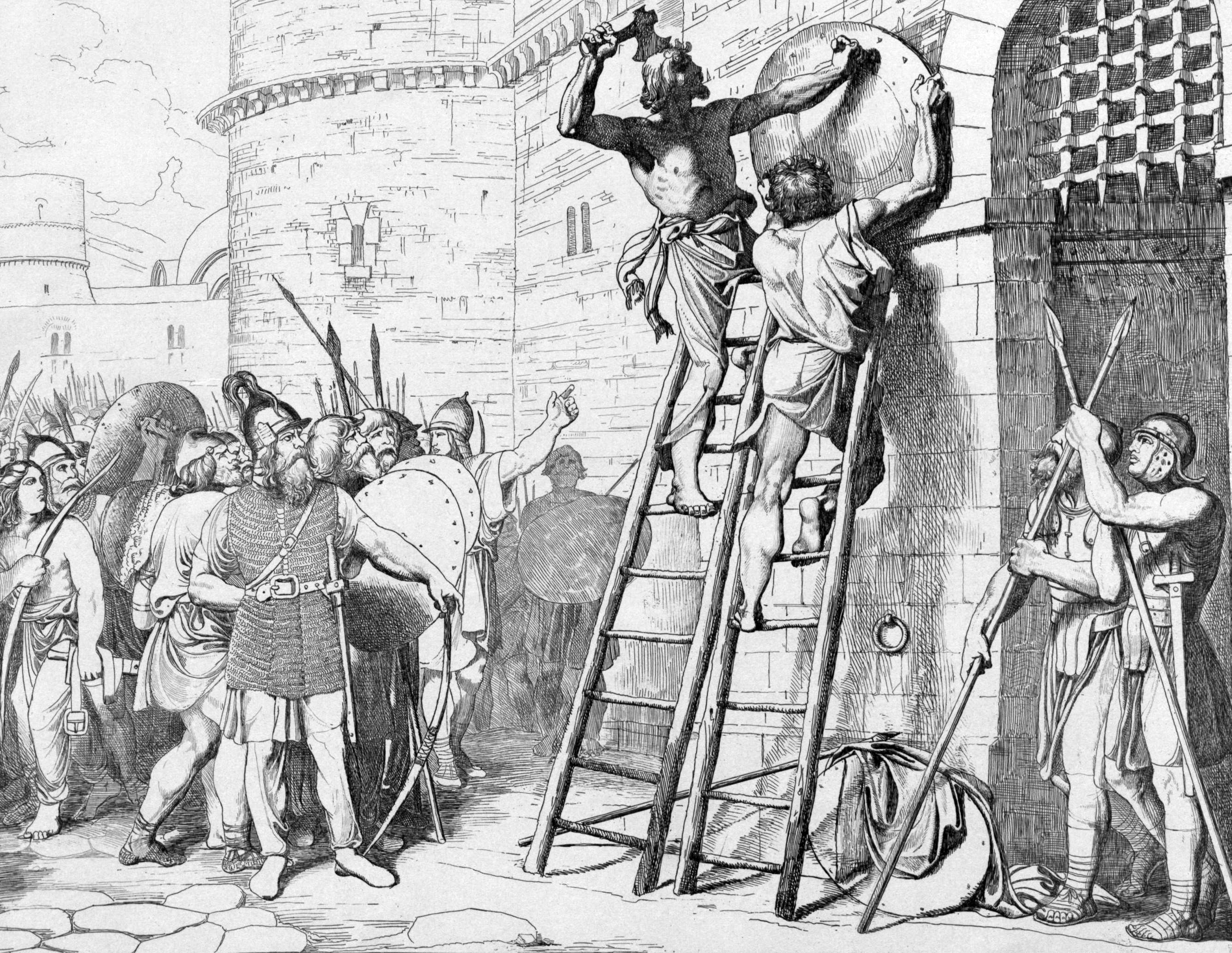
Prince Oleg having his shield nailed to the Walls of Constantinople, by Fyodor Bruni (before 1839)

Leo VI's fortune in war was more mixed than Basil's had been. In indulging his chief counselor Stylianos Zaoutzes, Leo provoked a war with Simeon I of Bulgaria in 894, but he was defeated. Bribing the Magyars to attack the Bulgarians from the north, Leo scored an indirect success in 895. However, deprived of his new allies, he lost the major Battle of Boulgarophygon in 896 and had to make the required commercial concessions and to pay annual tribute.

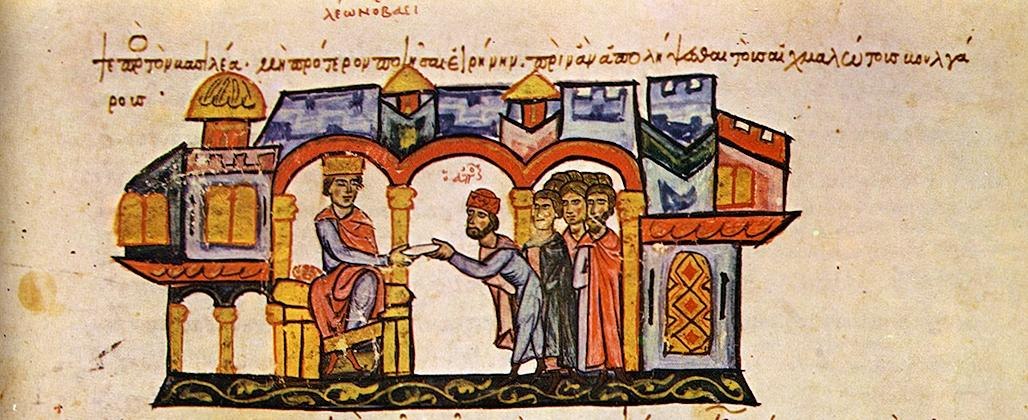
Leo VI receives Bulgarian envoys at his court.

Although he won a victory in 900 against the Emirate of Tarsus, in which the Arab army was destroyed and the Emir himself captured, in the west the Emirate of Sicily took Taormina, the last Byzantine outpost on the island of Sicily, in 902. Nevertheless, Leo continued to apply pressure on his eastern frontier through the creation of the new thema of Mesopotamia, a Byzantine invasion of Armenia in 902, and the sacking of Theodosiopolis, as well as successful raids in the Arab Thughur.

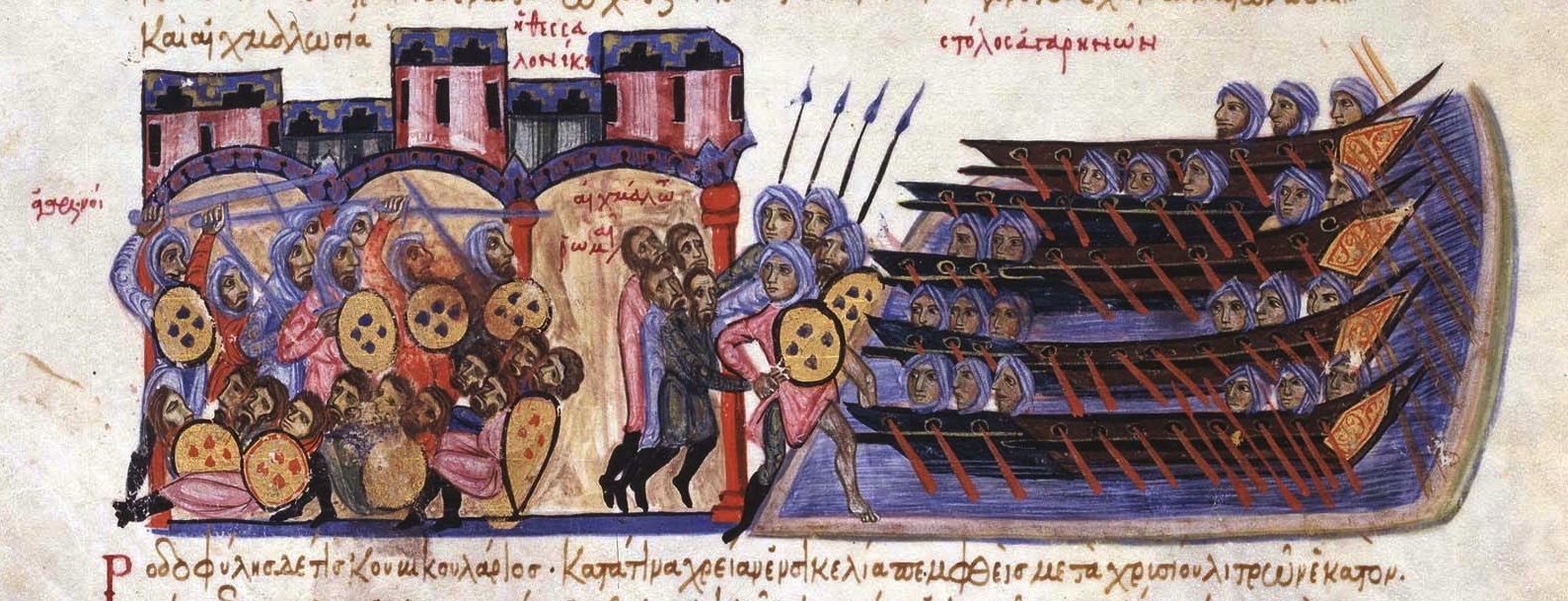
An Arab fleet under Leo of Tripoli sacks the city of Thessalonica.

Then, in 904 the renegade Leo of Tripolis sacked Thessalonica with his pirates—an event described in The Capture of Thessalonica by John Kaminiates—while a large-scale expedition to recover Crete under Himerios in 911–912 failed disastrously. Nevertheless, the same period also saw the establishment of the important frontier provinces (kleisourai) of Lykandos and Leontokome on territory recently taken from the Arabs. In 907, Constantinople was attacked by the Rus' led by Prince Oleg, who was seeking favorable trading rights with the empire. Leo paid them off, but they attacked again in 911, and a trade treaty was finally signed.

== Marriages ==
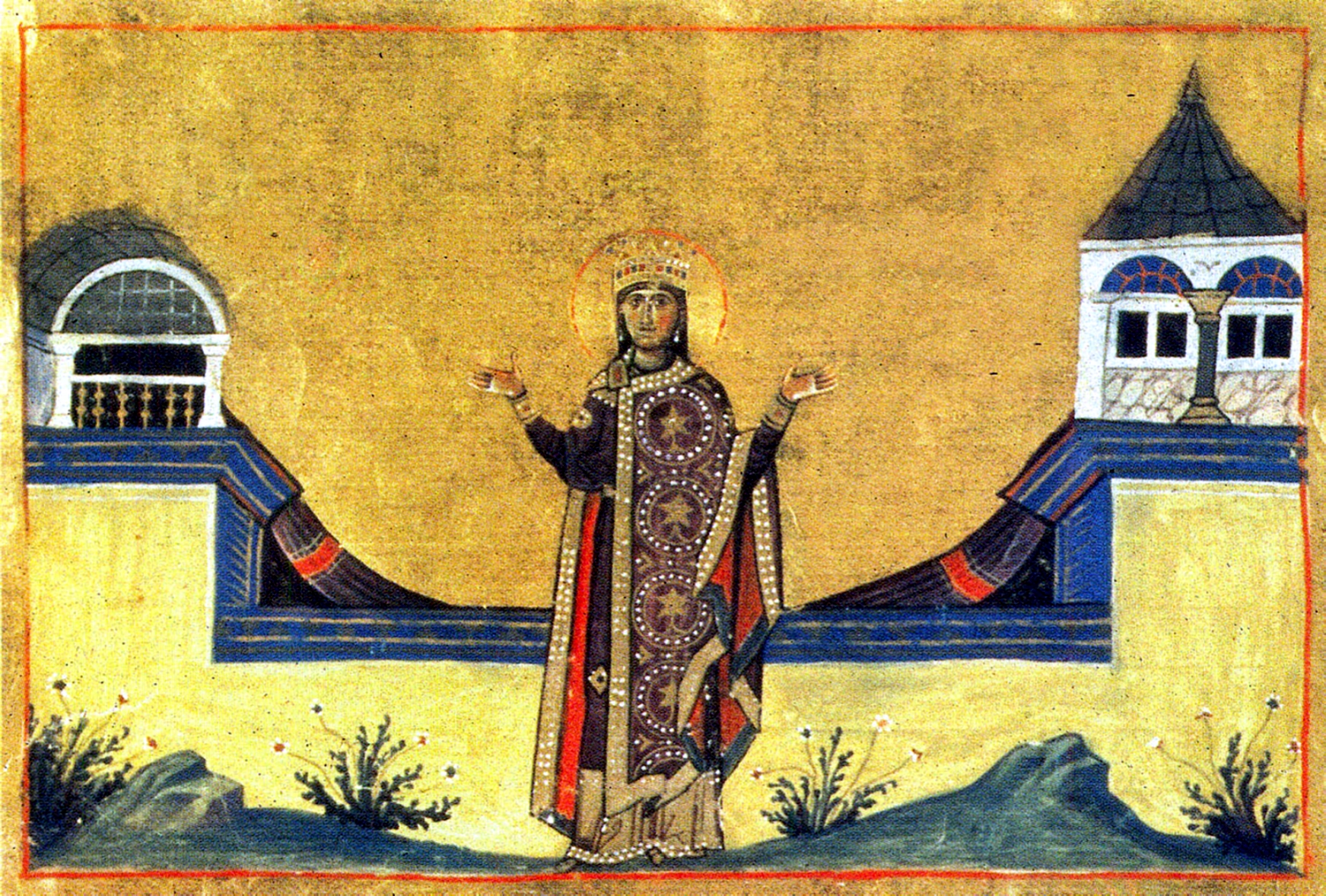
Empress Theophano, depicted in the 11th century Menologion of Basil II.

Leo VI caused a major scandal with his numerous marriages which failed to produce a legitimate heir to the throne. His first wife Theophano, whom Basil had forced him to marry on account of her family connections to the Martinakioi, and whom Leo hated, (Note: According to the Patriarch Euthymios' biographer, Leo once told Euthymios that "the whole Senate knows that it was against my will and in great sorrow that I married [Theophano]".) died in 897, and Leo married Zoe Zaoutzaina, the daughter of his adviser Stylianos Zaoutzes, though she died as well in 899. Upon this marriage Leo created the title of basileopatōr ("father of the emperor") for his father-in-law.

After Zoe's death a third marriage was technically illegal, but he married again, only to have his third wife Eudokia Baïana die in 901. Instead of marrying a fourth time, which would have been an even greater sin than a third marriage (according to the Patriarch Nicholas Mystikos) Leo took as mistress Zoe Karbonopsina. He married her only after she had given birth to a son in 905, but incurred the opposition of the patriarch. Replacing Nicholas Mystikos with Euthymios, Leo got his marriage recognized by the church (albeit with a long penance attached, and with an assurance that Leo would outlaw all future fourth marriages).

== Succession ==
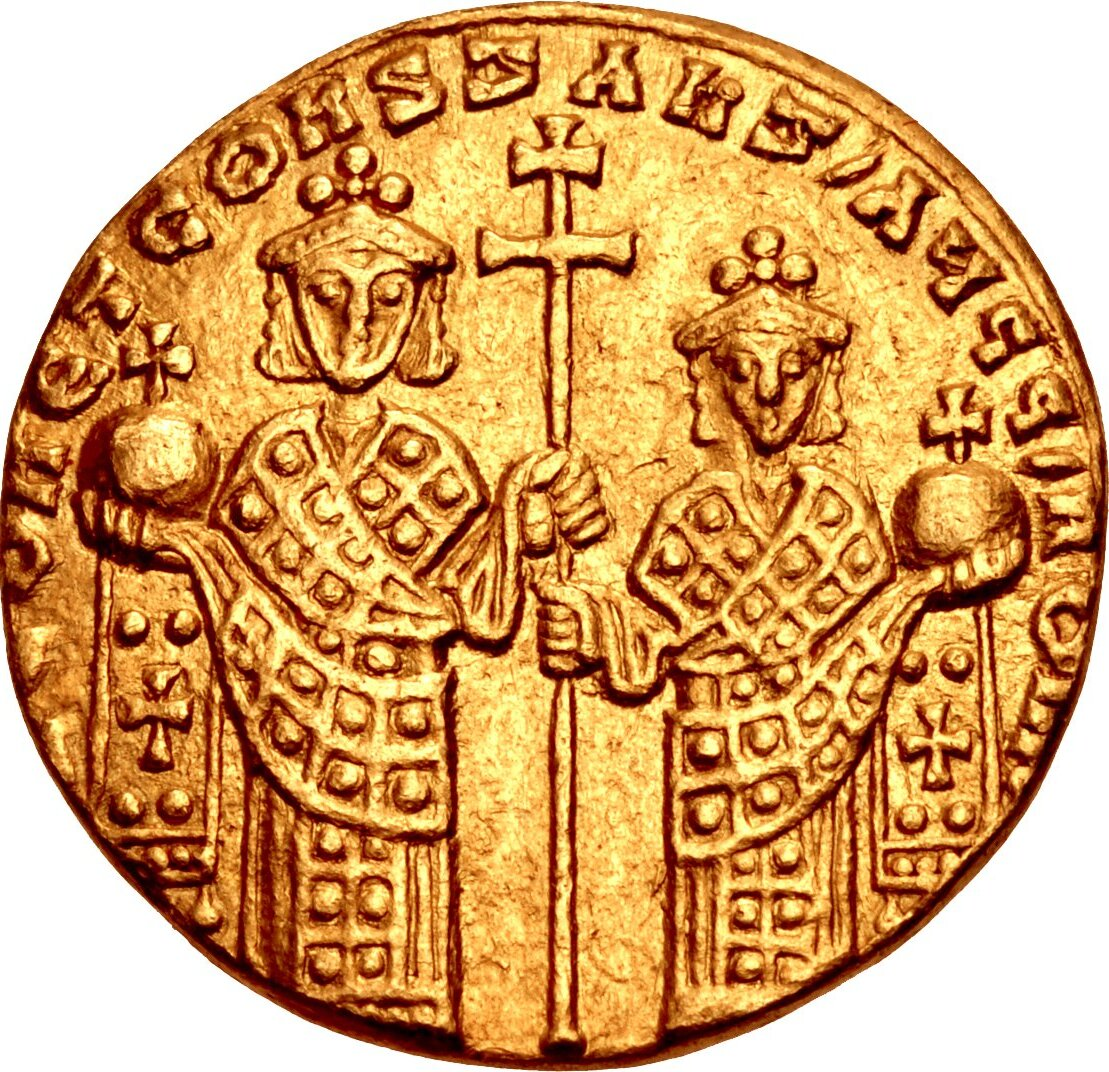
Gold solidus of Leo VI and Constantine VII Porphyrogennetos, 908–912

The future Constantine VII was the illegitimate son born before Leo's uncanonical fourth marriage to Zoe Karbonopsina. To strengthen his son's position as heir, Leo had Constantine crowned as co-emperor on 15 May 908, when he was only two years old. Leo VI died on 11 May 912. He was succeeded by his younger brother Alexander, who had reigned as emperor alongside his father and brother since 879.

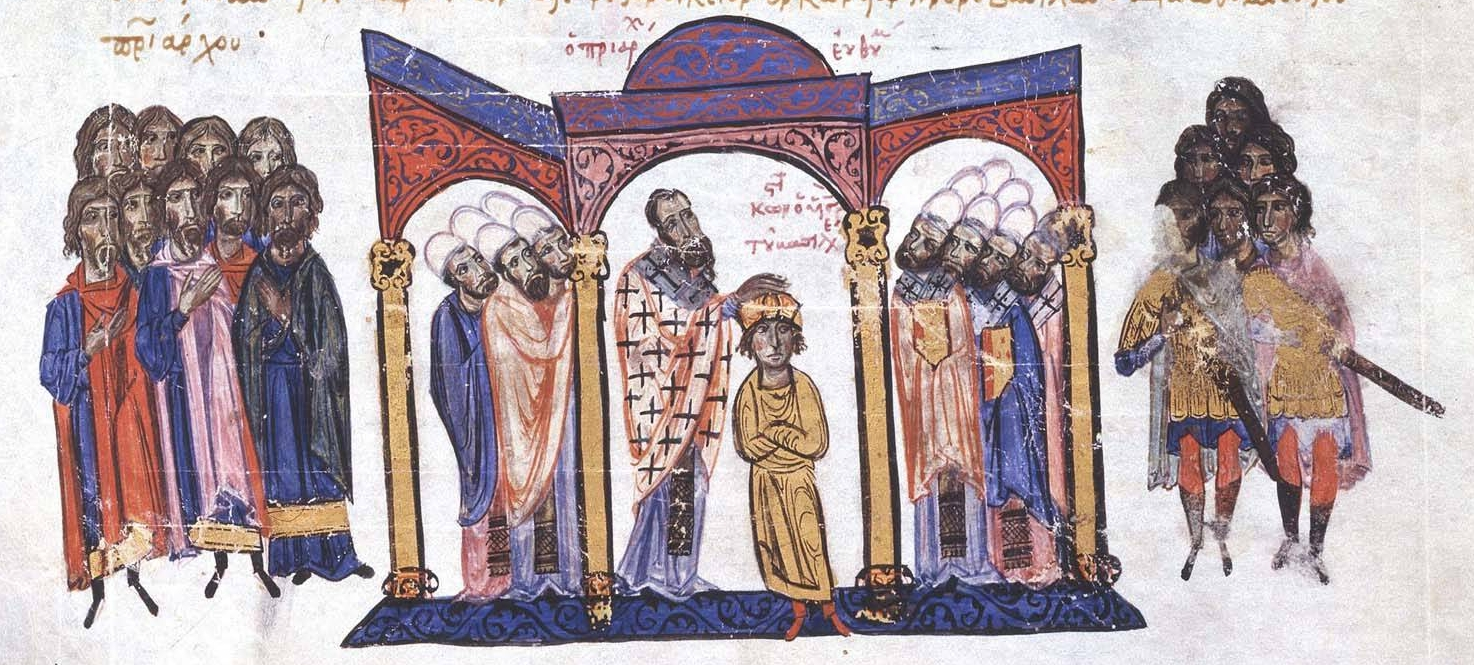
Coronation of Constantine VII by Patriarch Euthymius I.

Alexander died thirteen months later, and Constantine succeeded him. Shortly before Constantine reached the age of maturity, one of his regents made himself senior co-emperor as Romanos I. Romanus married his daughter to Constantine, and their son became emperor as Romanos II on Constantine's death in 959.

== Works ==
Leo VI was a prolific writer, and he produced works on many different topics and in many styles, including political orations, liturgical poems, and theological treatises. On many occasions he would personally deliver highly wrought and convoluted sermons in the churches of Constantinople.

In the subject matter of legal works and treatises, he established a legal commission that carried out his father's original intent of codifying all of existing Byzantine law. The end result was a six-volume work consisting of 60 books, entitled the Basilika. Written in Greek, the Basilika translated and systematically arranged practically all of the laws preserved in the Corpus Juris Civilis, thereby providing a foundation upon which all later Byzantine laws could be built. Leo then began integrating new laws issued during his reign into the Basilika. Called "Novels", or "New Laws", these were codes that dealt with current problems and issues, such as the prohibition on fourth marriages. Both the Basilika and the Novels were concerned with ecclesiastical law (canon law) as well as secular law. Most importantly, from a historical perspective, they finally did away with much of the remaining legal and constitutional architecture that the Byzantine Empire had inherited from the Roman Empire, and even from the days of the Roman Republic. Obsolete institutions such as the Curiae, the Roman Senate, even the Consulate, were finally removed from a legal perspective, even though these still continued in a lesser, decorative form.

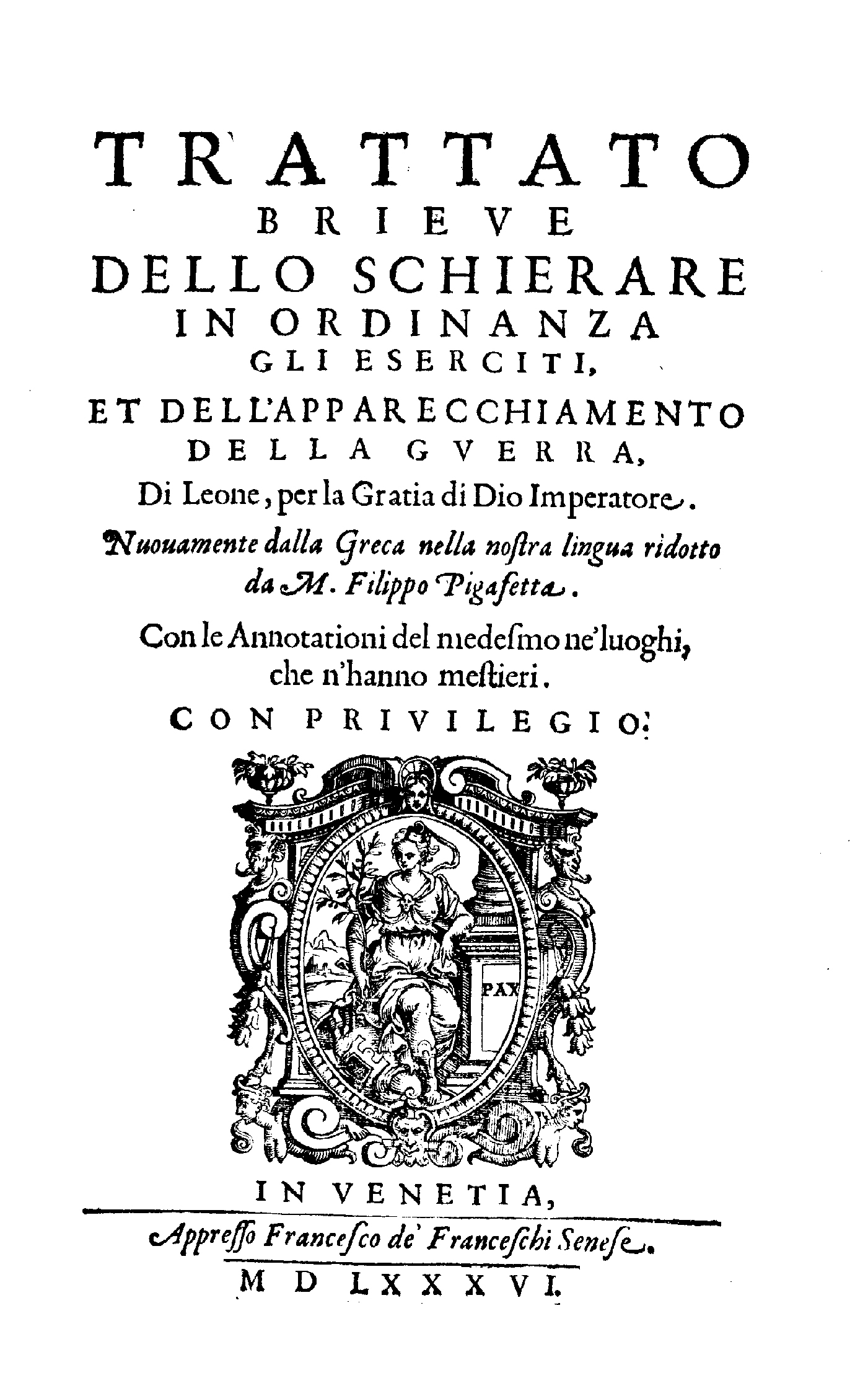
Tactica

The supposed Book of the Prefect and the Kletorologion of Philotheos were also issued under Leo's name and testify to his government's interest in organization and the maintenance of public order. The Book of the Eparch described the rules and regulations for trade and trade organizations in Constantinople, while the Kletorologion was an attempt to standardize officials and ranks at the Byzantine court. Leo is also the author, or at least sponsor, of the Tactica, a notable treatise on military operations.

Succeeding generations saw Leo as a prophet and a magician, and soon a collection of oracular poems and some short divinatory texts, the so-called Oracles of Leo the Wise, at least in part based on earlier Greek sources, were attached to the Emperor's name in later centuries and were believed to foretell the future of the world.

Finally, Leo is credited with translating the relics of St. Lazarus to Constantinople in the year 890. There are several stichera (hymns) attributed to him that are chanted on Lazarus Saturday in the Eastern Orthodox Church. He also composed hymns that are sung on the Great Feast of the Exaltation of the Cross.

== Family ==
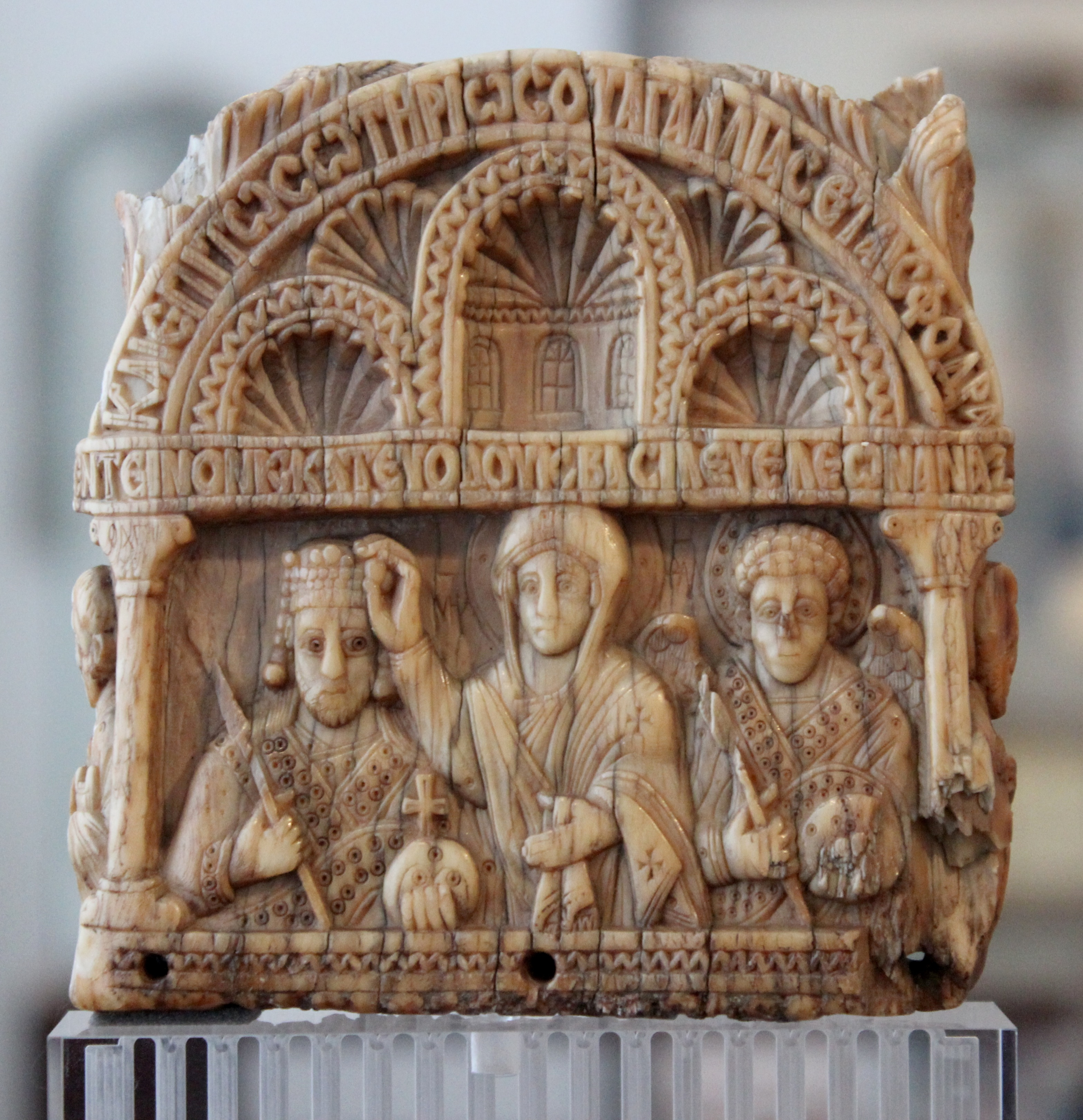
The Leo Scepter.

By his first wife, Theophano Martinakia, Leo VI had one daughter:

- Eudokia, who died in 892.

By his second wife, Zoe Zaoutzaina, Leo had one daughter:

- Anna of Constantinople, betrothed and married to the Holy Roman Emperor Louis the Blind.

By his third wife, Eudokia Baïana, Leo had one son:

- Basil, who survived for only a few days.

By his fourth wife, Zoe Karbonopsina, Leo had two children:

- Anna
- Constantine VII.

== See also ==
- List of Byzantine emperors

== Notes ==
Leo VI the Wise Macedonian dynasty Born: 19 September 866 Died: 11 May 912
Regnal titles
Preceded by Basil I	Byzantine emperor 29 August 886 – 11 May 912 with Basil I, 886–887	Succeeded by Alexander
Preceded by Basil I	Roman Consul; 1 January 887 - 11 May 912	Office abolished
