= Zoe Zaoutzaina =

9th-century Byzantine empress

- Augusta

Empress of the Byzantine Empire
- Tenure: 893/897–899
- Died: May 899
- Spouse: Theodore Gouniazizes; Leo VI the Wise
- Issue: by Leo; Anna
- Father: Stylianos Zaoutzes

Zoe Zaoutzaina (Greek: Ζωὴ Ζαούτζαινα, romanized: Zoí Zaoútzaina; died May 899) was a Byzantine empress consort as the second wife of the Byzantine emperor Leo VI the Wise. She was the daughter of Stylianos Zaoutzes, a high-ranking bureaucrat of Armenian origin.

== Royal mistress ==
The work Theophanes Continuatus was a continuation of the chronicle of Theophanes the Confessor by other writers, active during the reign of Constantine VII. According to it Zoe was first married to Theodore Gouniazizes, an otherwise obscure member of the court. She became mistress to the Emperor after the death of her husband. Theophanes records Theodore being poisoned, implicating Leo VI in his early demise. Symeon the Metaphrast records Leo falling in love with her in the third year of his reign, placing their meeting c. 889. At the time Leo was married to Theophano, daughter of Constantine Martiniakos. Their marriage had been arranged by his father Basil I. They had a daughter but the marriage of Leo VI and Theophano seems to have been loveless.

== Royal consort ==
Byzantine Greece in Zoe's time

In the seventh year of his reign (c. 893), Theophano retired to a monastery in the Blachernae suburb of Constantinople. Theophano is considered particularly devoted to the church throughout her life. Whether her retirement was voluntary is left vague by both Theophanes and Symeon. Zoe replaced her in the palace and court life. There is a contradiction on her particular status from c. 893 to 897. According to Symeon, the marriage of Leo VI to Theophano was officially declared void, allowing Leo and Zoe to marry within the year. According to Theophanes, the original marriage was still valid and Zoe remained the royal mistress. Both agree, however, that her father Stylianos Zaoutzes rose to the top of palace hierarchy and was even awarded the new title of basileopatōr ("father of the emperor"), which he held until his death in 899. Theophano died in her monastery on 10 November 897. According to Theophanes, Leo and Zoe proceeded to marry at this point. Both Symeon and Theophanes agree that Zoe was only crowned Augusta following the death of her predecessor.

== Death ==
Zoe herself died in 899. According to De Ceremoniis by Constantine VII, she had given birth to at least two daughters. However, Leo VI still had no son and his succession was not secure. Symeon records her being buried in the temple of her namesake Hagia Zoe. However, De Ceremoniis mentions her buried in the Church of the Holy Apostles where Leo VI, Theophano and third wife Eudokia Baïana were also buried. Providing both references were accurate, her remains were moved from the original burial place to that of her husband.

== Issue ==
According to De Ceremoniis by Constantine VII, Leo VI and Zoe had a daughter:

- Anna of Constantinople. She married Louis the Blind and was mother of Charles Constantine of Vienne.

== Sources ==
- Theophanes Continuatus, Chronicle.
- Symeon Metaphrastes, Chronicle.
- Constantine VII, De Ceremoniis.

Royal titles
Preceded by Theophano Martiniake	Byzantine Empress consort 893/897–899	Succeeded by Eudokia Baïana
