= Eudokia Baïana =

Byzantine empress from 900 to 901

Empress of the Byzantine Empire
- Tenure: 900–901
- Died: 12 April 901
- Spouse: Leo VI the Wise
- Issue: Basil

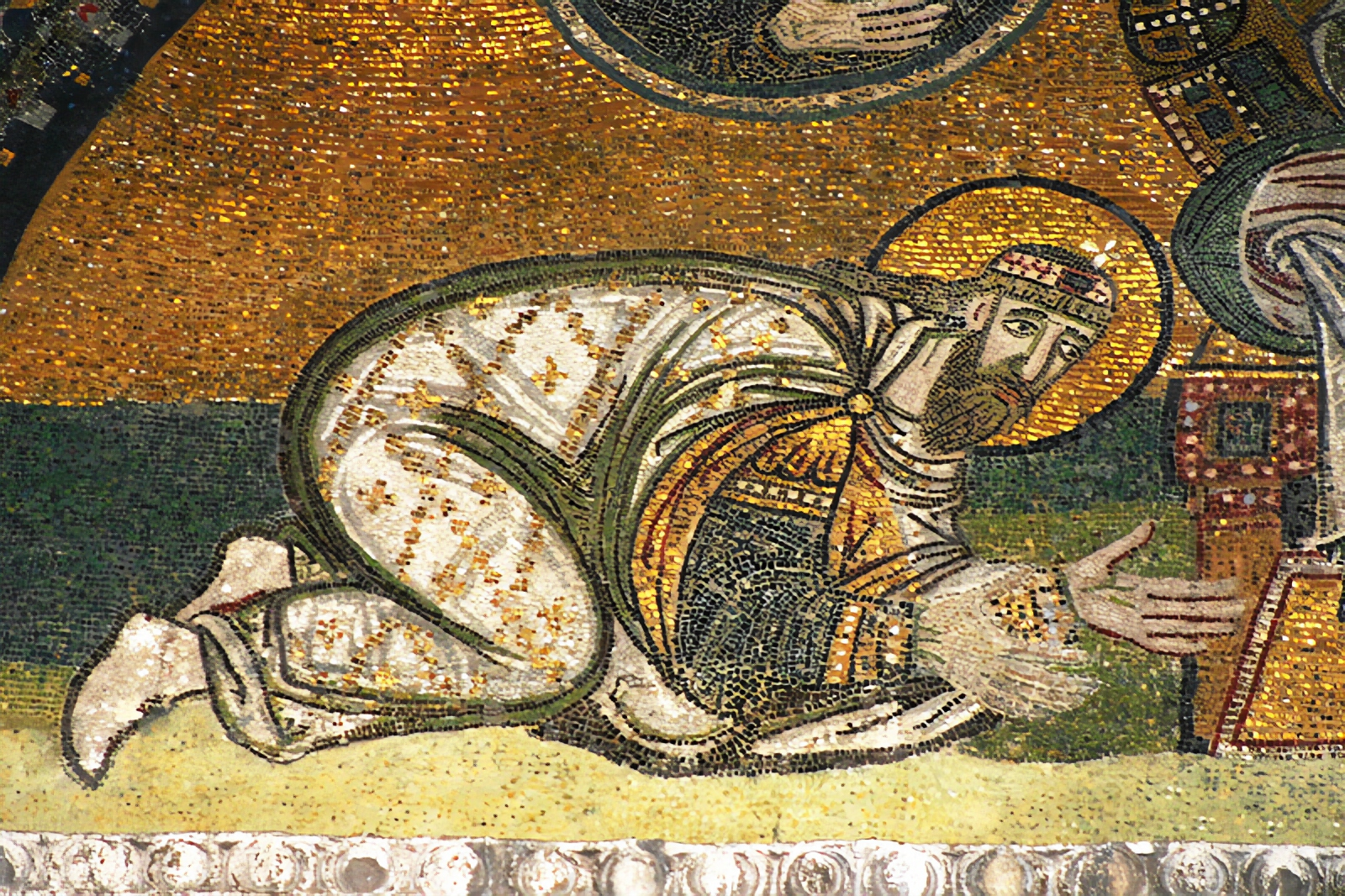
Detail of the mosaic of the Imperial Gate of Santa Sofia. Kneeling is the Byzantine emperor Leo VI the Wise, her husband

Eudokia Baïana (Greek: Εὐδοκία Βαϊανή, romanized: Evdokía Vaïáni; died 12 April 901) was a Byzantine empress consort as the third wife of Leo VI the Wise.

== Biography ==
The work Theophanes Continuatus was a continuation of the chronicle of Theophanes the Confessor by other writers, active during the reign of Constantine VII. The work records the few details known about Eudokia Baïana.

According to Theophanes, Eudokia came from the Opsician Theme. In the spring of the year 900 she married Leo VI, whose previous two wives had predeceased him. Leo's only surviving child was a daughter, and he hoped that the new marriage would produce a son and secure his succession. As noted by George Alexandrovič Ostrogorsky, a third marriage was technically against both Byzantine law and the practices of the contemporary Eastern Orthodox Church. It took place after Leo VI obtained special permission from Ecumenical Patriarch Antony II of Constantinople.

A year later, on April 12, 901, Eudokia died while giving birth. De Ceremoniis gives her burial place as the Church of the Holy Apostles in Constantinople. Theophanes says that the child was stillborn and unnamed. However, De Ceremoniis lists a boy called Basil among the children of Leo VI, which might indicate that Eudokia's son survived long enough to be named.

== Sources ==
- Theophanes Continuatus, Chronicle
- Constantine VII, De Ceremoniis

== See also ==
- List of Byzantine emperors
- List of Roman and Byzantine empresses

Royal titles
Preceded by Zoe Zaoutzaina	Byzantine Empress consort 900–901	Succeeded by Zoe Karbonopsina
