= Synkellos =

Synkellos (Greek: σύγκελλος), latinized as syncellus, is an ecclesiastical office in the Eastern Rite churches. In the Byzantine Empire, the synkellos of the Ecumenical Patriarch of Constantinople was a position of major importance in the state, and often was regarded as the successor-designate to the reigning patriarch.

The term is Greek and means "one who lives in the same cell" in a monastery. It is attested from the 5th century onward for the closest advisor of a bishop or archbishop, who then lived in the same residence or cell. In the Byzantine Empire, the synkellos of the Patriarch of Constantinople quickly acquired a pre-eminent position, and it often happened that a synkellos succeeded to the patriarchal throne when it fell vacant. This was certainly the expectation by the 9th–10th centuries, when the synkellos was an official appointed by the Emperor, and became a tool for imperial control of the patriarchal succession. Thus, although its members were lower-ranking clergymen—priests and deacons—in the Kletorologion of 899 he is listed among the senior secular officials of the state. The synkellos was one of the "special dignities" (ἀξίαι εἰδικαί, axiai eidikai), between the rhaiktor, and before the chartoularios tou kanikleiou. His exact duties are unclear, but he was considered a member of the Senate and was accorded a role in imperial ceremonies. In the Kletorologion, the synkellos was placed third of all secular offices in hierarchy, after the basileopator and the rhaiktor; in the overall hierarchy, which included ecclesiastical offices and holders of semi-imperial titles like Caesar, he came eighth after the rhaiktor and before the Archbishop of Bulgaria and the various patrikioi. The synkellos of the Patriarch of Rome took precedence over that of Constantinople, if present, and the synkelloi of the other patriarchates followed.

The prestige of the title was such that from the 10th century, it began to be sought by, and awarded to, ambitious metropolitan bishops, as well. Consequently, the title was gradually inflated to more grandiloquent forms like protosynkellos (πρωτοσύγκελλος, "first synkellos") or proedros ton protosynkellon (πρόεδρος τῶν πρωτοσυγκέλλων, "president of the protosynkelloi), and the original title lost its erstwhile significance. From the Palaiologan period on, the synkellos of the Patriarch of Constantinople was designated as megas protosynkellos (μέγας πρωτοσύγκελλος, "grand protosynkellos).

== Sources ==
- Athenagoras, Metropolitan of Paramythia and Parga (1927). "Ὁ θεσμός τῶν Συγκέλλων ἐν τῷ Οικουμενικῷ Πατριαρχείῳ" [The institution of the Synkelloi in the Ecumenical Patriarchate]. Ἐπετηρίς Ἐταιρείας Βυζαντινῶν Σπουδῶν (in Greek). IV: 3–38.
- Bury, J. B. (1911). The Imperial Administrative System of the Ninth Century – With a Revised Text of the Kletorologion of Philotheos. London: Oxford University Press. OCLC 1046639111.
- Papadakis, Aristeides (1991). "Synkellos". In Kazhdan, Alexander (ed.). The Oxford Dictionary of Byzantium. Oxford and New York: Oxford University Press. pp. 1993–1994. ISBN 0-19-504652-8.
