= Theophano Martinakia =

Byzantine empress from 886 to 893

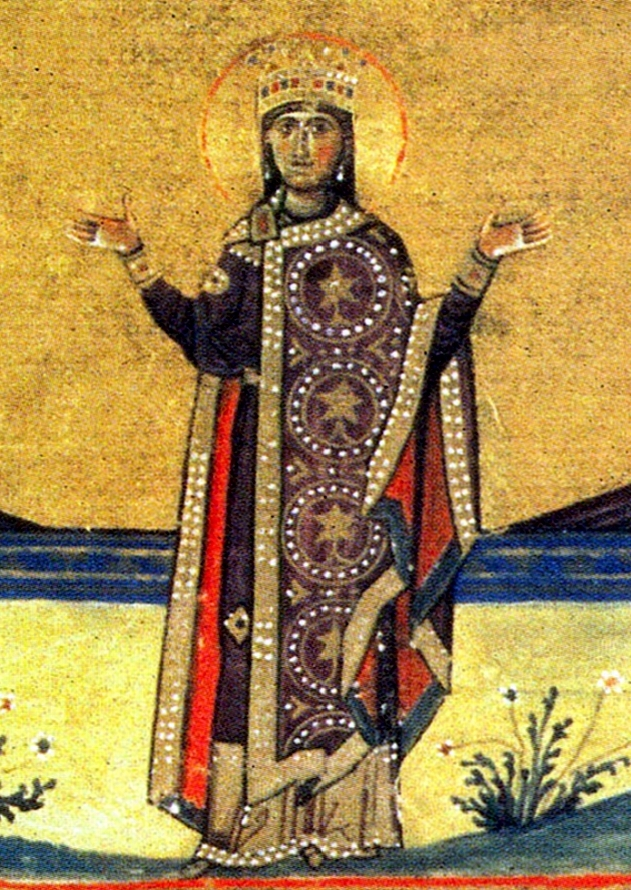
- Miniature of Theophano Martinakia in the Menologion of Basil II, c. 1000.

Byzantine Empress consort
- Tenure: 29 August 886 – 893
- Died: 10 November 897 a monastery, Constantinople (modern-day Istanbul, Turkey)
- Burial: Church of the Holy Apostles, Constantinople
- Spouse: Leo VI the Wise
- Issue: Eudokia Porphyrogenita
- Dynasty: Martinakioi
- Father: Constantine Martinakios

Theophano Martinakia (Greek: Θεοφανώ; 866/67 – 10 November 897) was a Byzantine empress by marriage to Leo VI the Wise. She is venerated as a saint by the Eastern Orthodox Church.

== Family ==
Born in c. 866/67, she was a daughter of Constantine Martinakios and Anna. Her family, the Martinakioi, were related to the Amorian dynasty, which ruled the Byzantine Empire from 820 to 867. In the decades prior to Theophano's birth, a prophecy had predicted that the family of Martinakios would take the throne. In reaction, the Amorian emperor Theophilos forced his kinsman Martinakes to become a monk and convert his personal house into a monastery.

== Empress ==
The chronicle of Symeon Metaphrastes places the marriage of Leo VI and Theophano in the sixteenth year of the reign of Basil I, that is, between September 882 and September 883. The marriage was arranged by Basil I and forced on Leo VI, and its eventual failure may have been influenced by the poor relation of father and son. Basil died on 29 August 886. Leo succeeded him to the throne and Theophano became his empress.

Symeon records Leo falling in love with Zoe Zaoutzaina in the third year of his reign (c. 889). Zoe became his mistress and replaced Theophano in his affections.

== Monastic life ==
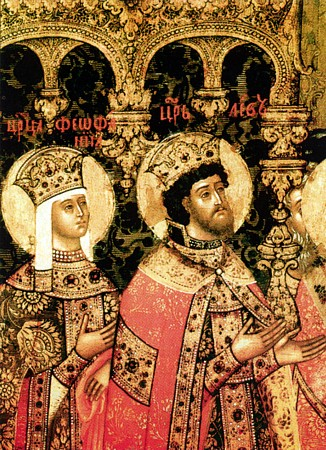
Theophano and Leo VI, 18th-century painting.

In the seventh year of Leo's reign (c. 893), Theophano retired to a monastery in the Blachernae suburb of Constantinople. She is considered to have been particularly devoted to the church throughout her life, but both Theophanes and Symeon are vague about whether her retirement was voluntary. Zoe replaced her in the palace and court life.

There is a contradiction on her particular status from c. 893 to 897. According to Symeon, the marriage of Leo VI to Theophano was officially void, allowing Leo and Zoe to marry within the year. According to Theophanes, the original marriage was still valid and Zoe remained the imperial mistress.

== Death and canonization ==
Theophano died in her monastery on 10 November 897. According to Theophanes, Leo and Zoe married at this point, while Symeon reports them married earlier. Both Symeon and Theophanes agree that Zoe was only crowned augusta following the death of her predecessor.

Theophano was glorified (canonized a saint) by the Eastern Orthodox Church following her death. Her feast day is 16 December of the Eastern Orthodox Church calendar. After her death, her husband built a church, intending to dedicate it to her. When he was forbidden to do so, he decided to dedicate it to "All Saints," so that if his wife were in fact one of the righteous, she would also be honored whenever its feast day was celebrated. According to tradition, it was Leo who expanded the celebration on the Sunday following Pentecost from a commemoration of All Martyrs to a general commemoration of All Saints, whether martyrs or not.

== Children ==
Leo VI and Theophano only had one daughter, Eudokia (after Eudokia Ingerina), who died young. Eudokia was buried in the Church of the Holy Apostles along with her father and mother.

== Sources ==
- Lilie, Ralph-Johannes; Ludwig, Claudia; Pratsch, Thomas; Zielke, Beate (2013). Prosopographie der mittelbyzantinischen Zeit Online. Berlin-Brandenburgische Akademie der Wissenschaften. Nach Vorarbeiten F. Winkelmanns erstellt (in German). Berlin and Boston: De Gruyter.

Royal titles
Preceded by Eudokia Ingerina	Byzantine Empress consort 886–897	Succeeded by Zoe Zaoutzaina
