= Avgury =

Russian masculine given name

Avgury (Russian: Авгу́рий) is an old and rare Russian male first name. It is derived from the Latin word augur, meaning a priest who interpreted the will of the gods by studying the flight of birds; itself derived from the word avis, meaning bird.

The patronymics derived from this first name are "Авгу́риевич" (Avguriyevich; masculine) and "Авгу́риевна" (Avguriyevna; feminine).
