= Sergios Niketiates =

Sergios Niketiates (Greek: Σέργιος Νικητιάτης, fl. c. 843) was a senior Byzantine official and member of the Amorian dynasty. He is celebrated as a saint by the Eastern Orthodox Church on 28 June for his role in the restoration of the veneration of icons.

== Biography ==
Sergios Niketiates is an obscure and "enigmatic" (Cyril Mango) figure, known only through brief references in two hagiographic works, the Acts of Saints David, Symeon and George and the Synaxarium Constantinopolitanum. According to these, Sergios was born in the village of Niketia, near Amastris in Paphlagonia, whence his surname. He was a close relative, possibly the uncle, of Empress Theodora, the wife of Emperor Theophilos (r. 829–842) and mother of Michael III (r. 842–867).

Under Theophilos, he became one of the leading members of the Byzantine Senate, reaching the supreme court rank of magistros. Seals attributed to him also record him having progressively advanced through the levels of hypatos, anthypatos, protospatharios and patrikios, and having held the office of General Logothete or Logothete of the Drome (depending on the reading of the seals).

In 843, Sergios was instrumental, along with the logothete Theoktistos and Theodora's brothers, Bardas and Petronas, in bringing about the final abandonment of Iconoclasm and the restoration of the veneration of icons, an act for which he is celebrated as a saint by the Eastern Orthodox Church on 28 June.

In the same year, according to the Synaxarium Constantinopolitanum, he was entrusted with leading an expedition against the Emirate of Crete, but all other sources record that Theoktistos led the campaign. It is possible, however, that Sergios was left behind when Theoktistos was forced to hurriedly return to Constantinople. Sergios died on Crete, where the Byzantine forces were defeated by the Arabs, and was initially buried on the island in a monastery that became known after him as tou Magistrou ("of the magistros"). He was later moved to a Monastery of the Theotokos in the Gulf of Nicomedia, which he had founded and which in turn became known as tou Niketiatou thereafter.

The French Byzantinist Henri Grégoire suggested that Niketiates is to be identified with "Ibn Qatuna", the admiral recorded in Arabic sources as having led the Byzantines in their sack of Damietta in 853, but although this hypothesis was taken up by some (notably Alexander Vasiliev), it is rejected by modern scholars. Grégoire also hypothesized that Sergios was the brother of the later Patriarch Photios, a conjecture also rejected, although according to Cyril Mango he could possibly be Photios's maternal uncle.

== Sources ==
- Mango, Cyril (1977). "The Liquidation of Iconoclasm and the Patriarch Photios". In Bryer, Anthony; Herrin, Judith (eds.). Iconoclasm: Papers Given at the Ninth Spring Symposium of Byzantine Studies, University of Birmingham, March 1975. Centre for Byzantine Studies, University of Birmingham. pp. 133–140. ISBN 0-7044-0226-2.
- Kazhdan, Alexander; Talbot, Alice-Mary; Alexakis, Alexander; Efthymiadis, Stephanos; McGrath, Stamatina; Sherry, Lee Francis; Zielke, Beate, eds. (1998). Dumbarton Oaks Hagiography Database of the Eighth, Ninth and Tenth Century (PDF). Washington, DC: Dumbarton Oaks.
- Lilie, Ralph-Johannes; Ludwig, Claudia; Pratsch, Thomas; Zielke, Beate (2001). Prosopographie der mittelbyzantinischen Zeit: 1. Abteilung (641–867), Band 4: Platon (# 6266) – Theophylaktos (# 8345) (in German). Berlin and Boston: De Gruyter. ISBN 978-3-11-016674-3.
