= Zoste patrikia =

Chief attendant and assistant to the Byzantine Empress

Zōstē patrikía (Greek: ζωστὴ πατρικία) was a Byzantine court title reserved exclusively for the woman who was the chief attendant and assistant to the empress. A very high title, its holder ranked as the first woman after the Empress herself in the imperial court. The title is attested from the 9th century until the 12th century, but only a handful of its holders are known.

== History ==
The title means "girded lady-patrician", often translated into English as "Mistress of the Robes", and was used for high-ranking court ladies who were attached to the Byzantine empresses as their ladies of honour. Its origin or date of institution are unclear.

Disregarding a clearly anachronistic reference to Antonina, the wife of the great 6th-century general Belisarius, as being a zostē patrikia, the title is first attested in c. 830 for Theoktiste, the mother of Empress Theodora.

The title is last attested in literary sources (the Skylitzes Chronicle) in 1018, when it was conferred to Maria, the former Empress of Bulgaria, and finally in a series of lead seals dated to the late 11th century (see below). It disappears thereafter, along with many other titles of the middle Byzantine period, following the reforms of Emperor Alexios I Komnenos (r. 1081–1118).

== Status and functions ==
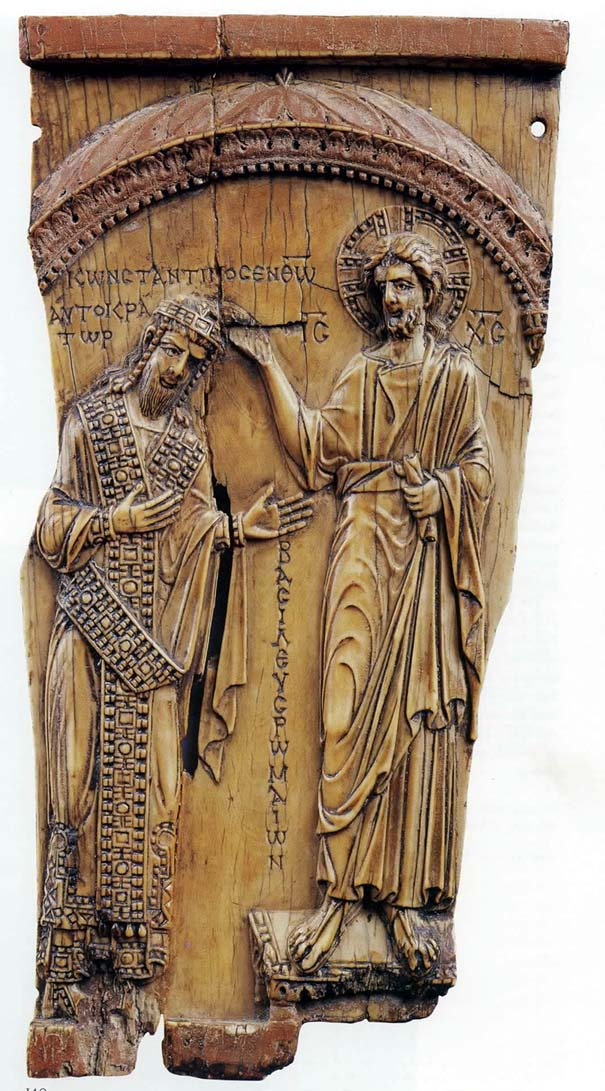
Ivory carving showing Constantine VII dressed with the loros and crowned by Christ

In Philotheos's Klētorologion of 899, the dignity of the zostē patrikia is placed very high in the imperial order of precedence, coming before the magistros and after the kouropalatēs. Her exceptional status is further illustrated by the fact that she was one of only six dignitaries who dined at the imperial table—along with the Patriarch of Constantinople, the Caesar, the nōbelissimos, the kouropalatēs and the basileopatōr—and by the prominent role she played in imperial ceremonies, especially those revolving around the Empress, such as the coronation of an empress or the birth of a child. Although it appears that, in common with the other supreme dignities with which it is associated, there was a single holder of the dignity at each time, at the reception of Olga of Kiev, the plural form zōstai is used, indicating the presence of at least two. This may be accounted for by the fact that at times there were several empresses, and that each one must have had a zōstē in her particular service.

The zōstē patrikia functioned as the chief attendant to the empress (to whom she was usually related) and the head of the women's court (the sekreton tōn gynaikōn), which consisted mostly of the wives of high-ranking officials. Indeed, hers was the only specifically female dignity: other women bore the feminine versions of their husbands' titles. A zōstē patrikia is therefore, in John B. Bury's words, "the only lady who was πατρικία in her own right", and not to be confused with a simple patrikia, who was the spouse or widow of a patrikios. Indeed, the French scholar Rodolphe Guilland points out that the title itself appears to be a compound one, with the sources sometimes calling it "the zōstē and patrikia", indicating that the noble title of patrikia was added to the court dignity of zōstē.

The zōstē was raised to the rank in an elaborate investiture ceremony in the Theotokos of the Pharos palace chapel, which is recorded in the De Ceremoniis (I.50) of Emperor Constantine VII Porphyrogennetos (r. 913–959). The ceremony ended in the Chrysotriklinos audience hall, where she received from the emperor's hands the ivory tablets that were the particular insignium of her office. She then visited the Hagia Sophia, where the tablets were blessed by the Patriarch, before making her way to the Magnaura, where she received the congratulations of the women of the court and the spouses of the high dignitaries. Finally, she returned to the Pharos chapel, where she deposited an offering of 70 nomismata, before retiring to her apartments. The distinctive dress of the zōstē, which probably gave the title her name, was the broad belt or loros that she put on at the investiture ceremony. A descendant of the ancient Roman consular trabea, the golden lōros was the "most prestigious imperial insignium", and was also worn by the Byzantine emperor and a select few of his highest dignitaries such as the Eparch of Constantinople or the magistroi. A less likely origin of the zōstē may derive from her position as chief lady-in-waiting to the empress, among whose duties was to supervise her dress, or, as the Patria of Constantinople puts it, to "gird" the empress.

The zōstē held her title for life, even after the death of an empress she had been appointed to serve. In addition, like most Byzantine titles, the dignity could be conferred as a simple honour without the requirement of service, as was most likely the case with Theoktiste and Maria, the widow of Tsar Ivan Vladislav of Bulgaria.

== List of known holders ==
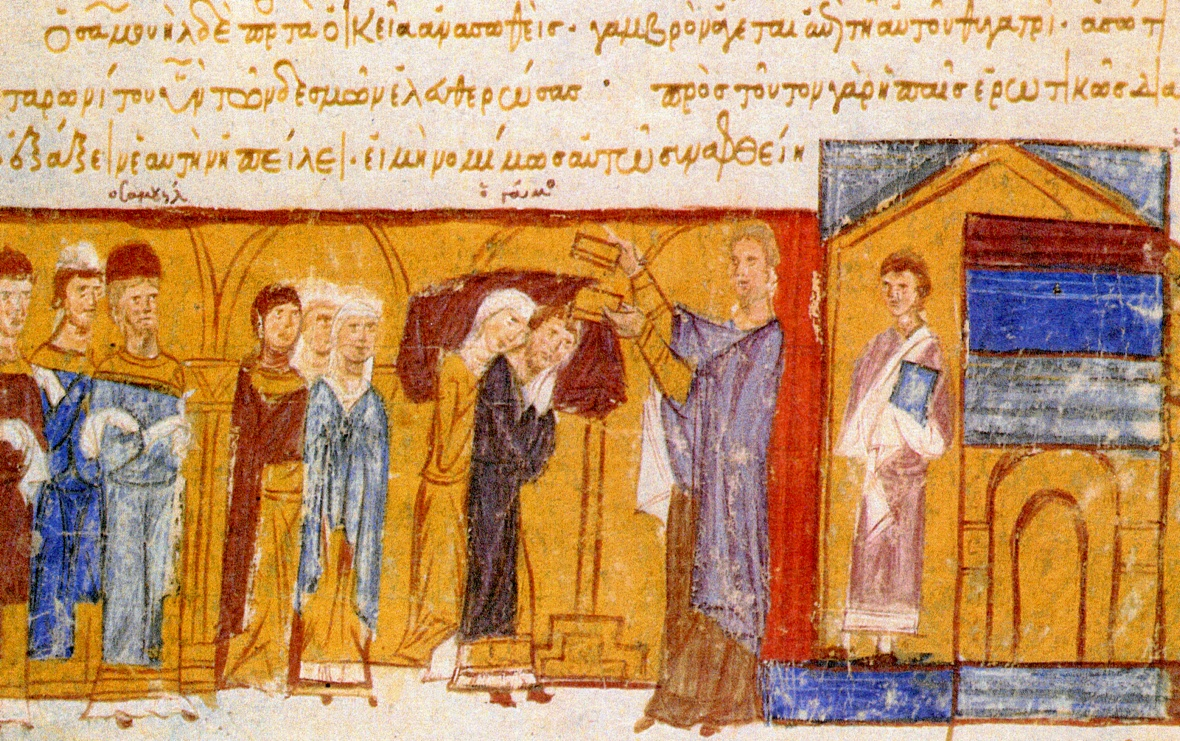
Miniature from the Madrid Skylitzes depicting the wedding of Miroslava of Bulgaria to the Byzantine-Armenian aristocrat Ashot Taronites. The couple fled to Byzantium, where Miroslava was appointed zōstē patrikia.

Despite the prominence of their title, zōstai are rarely mentioned in contemporary sources. As Rodolphe Guilland writes, "confined to the women's quarters of the empress, they hardly had the opportunity to become known. Certainly the women's quarters were sometimes a hotbed of intrigue and scandal; but the noise of these intrigues and these scandals hardly crossed the walls of the Great Palace."

- Antonina, wife of Belisarius (anachronistic reference from the Patria of Constantinople).
- Theoktiste, mother of Empress Theodora, the wife of Emperor Theophilos (r. 829–842).
- Anastasia, known only through a single reference in the late 10th-century Life of Basil the Younger hagiography. She might be identifiable with Anastaso, the daughter of the patrikios Adralestos, who later married into the Maleinos family and was mother to Constantine Maleinos and Michael Maleinos.
- Olga of Kiev is sometimes considered as having been created a zōstē during her visit to Constantinople.
- Miroslava of Bulgaria, daughter of Emperor Samuel of Bulgaria (r. 997–1014), who defected to Byzantium along with her husband, Ashot Taronites.
- Empress Maria, wife of Emperor Ivan Vladislav of Bulgaria (r. 1015–1018). She was conferred the title after she fled to the Byzantine court following the murder of her husband.
- Khousousa, wife of Seneqerim-Hovhannes, last ruler of the Kingdom of Vaspurakan prior to the Byzantine annexation of his realm in 1022. She is known through a seal mentioning her as "zōstē and mother of David the magistros".
- Irene, attested only through an 11th-century seal which describes her as a nun.
- Maria Melissene, attested in a seal dated to c. 1060–1070. It has been suggested that she might be the mother of Nikephoros Melissenos, the brother-in-law of Emperor Alexios I Komnenos.
- Anna Radene, a close friend of Michael Psellos, probably c. 1070.
- Helena Tornikine, "zōstē and kouropalatissa", attested in a seal dated to c. 1070–1110.

== Bibliography ==
- Bury, J. B. (1911). The Imperial Administrative System of the Ninth Century – With a Revised Text of the Kletorologion of Philotheos. London: Oxford University Press. OCLC 1046639111.
- Cheynet, Jean-Claude (2000). "La patricienne à ceinture: une femme de qualité". In Henriet, Patrick; Legras, Anne-Marie (eds.). Au cloître et dans le monde: femmes, hommes et sociétés (IXe-XVe siècle) - Mélanges en l'honneur de Paulette L'Hermite-Leclercq (in French). Paris: Presses de l'Université Paris-Sorbonne. pp. 179–187. ISBN 978-2-84050-180-0.
- Davids, Adelbert (2002) [1995]. The Empress Theophano: Byzantium and the West at the Turn of the First Millennium. Cambridge: Cambridge University Press. ISBN 978-0-521-52467-4.
- Garland, Lynda (1999). Byzantine Empresses: Women and Power in Byzantium, AD 527–1204. New York and London: Routledge. ISBN 978-0-415-14688-3.
- Guilland, Rodolphe (1971). "Contribution à l'histoire administrative de l'empire byzantin: la patricienne à ceinture, ἠ ζωστὴ πατρικία". Byzantinoslavica (in French). 32: 269–275.
- Kazhdan, Alexander, ed. (1991). The Oxford Dictionary of Byzantium. Oxford and New York: Oxford University Press. ISBN 0-19-504652-8.
- Maguire, Henry (2004) [1997]. Byzantine Court Culture from 829 to 1204. Washington, DC: Dumbarton Oaks. ISBN 978-0-88402-308-1.
- McClanan, Anne L. (2002). Representations of Early Byzantine Empresses: Image and Empire. New York: Palgrave Macmillan. ISBN 978-0-312-29492-2.
- Sayre, P. G. (1986). "The Mistress of the Robes: Who was She?". Byzantine Studies/Études Byzantines. 13: 229–239.
