= Theoktiste =

Byzantine noblewoman

- Zoste patrikia
- Born: c. 785
- Died: c. 835
- Burial: Gastria Monastery
- Spouse: Marinos
- Issue: Bardas; Petronas; Theodora; Sophia; Maria; Eirene

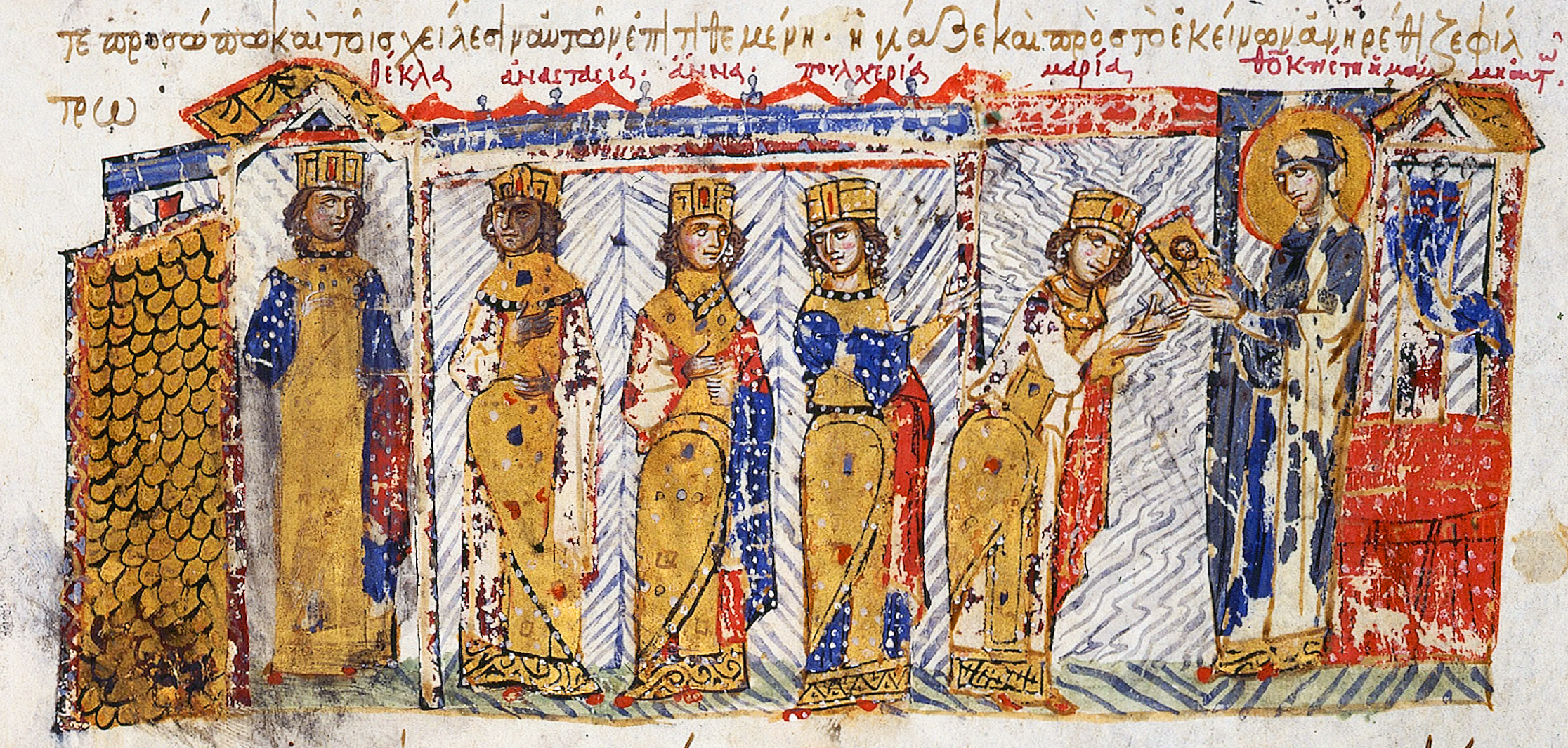
The daughters of Theodora being instructed in the veneration of the icons by their grandmother Theoktiste. Miniature from the Madrid Skylitzes

Theoktiste (Greek: Θεοκτίστη), also known as Phlorina (Φλώρινα), was the mother of the 9th-century Byzantine empress Theodora, the wife of Emperor Theophilos.

== Life ==
Theoktiste Phlorina was the spouse of Marinos, an officer in the Byzantine army with the rank of tourmarches or droungarios. The family originally lived in, or hailed from, the town of Ebissa in Paphlagonia. Some modern genealogists, including Cyril Toumanoff and Nicholas Adontz, have suggested that Marinos hailed from the Armenian noble clan of the Mamikonian. According to Nina Garsoïan in the Oxford Dictionary of Byzantium, however, "[a]ttractive though it is, this thesis cannot be proven for want of sources."

With Marinos, Theoktiste had two sons, Bardas and Petronas, and four daughters, Theodora, Sophia, Maria and Irene. In 821 or 830 (the date is disputed), Theodora married Theophilos, who in 829 succeeded his father Michael II the Amorian (ruled 820–829) as emperor. With her daughter's coronation as empress, Theoktiste too was honoured with the exalted title of zoste patrikia. At about the same time she bought a mansion in Constantinople, in the quarter of Psamathia, from the patrikios Niketas, which became her residence.

Unlike her son-in-law Theophilos, who was an ardent iconoclast, Theoktiste was reportedly an iconodule. Not only did she aid persecuted iconodules, but when Theodora's five daughters visited her in her house, she would instruct them in the veneration of the icons, much to the anger of Theophilos, who forbade his daughters from visiting their grandmother too often. Her house was later—possibly still during Theophilos' reign (829–842)—transformed into the Gastria Monastery. Theoktiste and Theodora, as well as other members of the family, were buried there.

Of her other children, Bardas and Petronas would go on to become major figures in the reign of Theodora and Theophilos's son, Michael III (r. 842–867), Sophia married the magistros Constantine Baboutzikos, Maria, also known as Kalomaria ("Maria the Beautiful") married the patrikios and later magistros Arsaber, while Irene married the patrikios Sergios, either the brother or the maternal uncle of the future Patriarch of Constantinople Photios.

== Sources ==
- Guilland, Rodolphe (1971). "Contribution à l'histoire administrative de l'Empire byzantin: la patricienne à ceinture, ἠ ζωστὴ πατρικία". Byzantinoslavica (in French). 32: 269–275.
- Kazhdan, Alexander, ed. (1991). The Oxford Dictionary of Byzantium. Oxford and New York: Oxford University Press. ISBN 0-19-504652-8.
- Lilie, Ralph-Johannes; Ludwig, Claudia; Pratsch, Thomas; Zielke, Beate (2001). Prosopographie der mittelbyzantinischen Zeit: 1. Abteilung (641–867), Band 4: Platon (# 6266) – Theophylaktos (# 8345) (in German). Berlin and Boston: De Gruyter. ISBN 978-3-11-016674-3.
