= Augury =

Roman religious practice

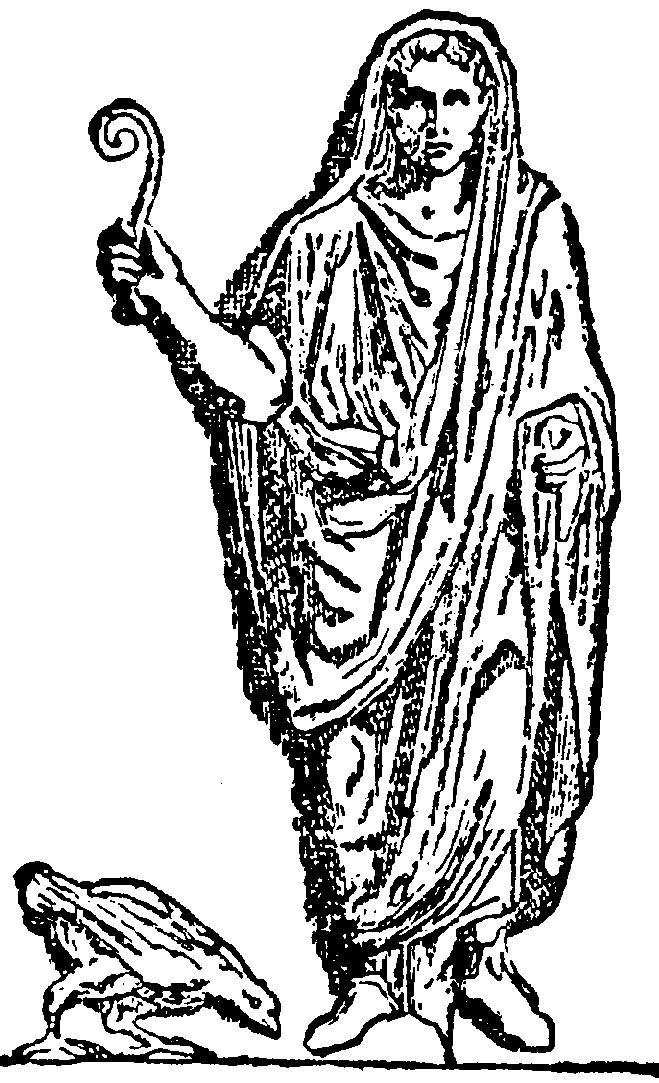
An augur with sacred chicken; he holds a lituus, the curved wand often used as a symbol of augury on Roman coins

Augury was the Roman religious practice of observing the behavior of birds to receive omens. When the individual, known as the augur, read these signs, it was referred to as "taking the auspices". "Auspex” (plural, “auspices”) (Latin: auspicium) means "one who divines by looking at birds". Depending upon the birds, the auspices from the gods could be favorable or unfavorable (auspicious or inauspicious). Sometimes politically motivated augurs would fabricate unfavorable auspices in order to delay certain state functions, such as elections. Pliny the Elder attributes the invention of auspicy to Tiresias the seer of Thebes.

Over the development of the Roman empire, the definition of augury broadened to include other forms of divination. Haruspicy—the examination of animal entrails—was learned from the Etruscans. The Etruscan practice of observing thunder and lightning was also adapted. In Cicero's time, the augurs had mostly switched from using the flight of birds to haruspicy for public divination.

This type of omen reading was already a millennium old in the time of Classical Greece: in the fourteenth-century BCE diplomatic correspondence preserved in Egypt called the Amarna correspondence, the practice was familiar to the king of Alasia in Cyprus who needed an "eagle diviner" to be sent from Egypt. This earlier, indigenous practice of divining by bird signs—familiar in the figure of Calchas, the bird-diviner to Agamemnon who led the army (Iliad I.69)—was largely replaced by sacrifice-divination through inspection of the sacrificial victim's liver—haruspices—during the Orientalizing period of archaic Greek culture. Plato notes that hepatoscopy held greater prestige than augury by means of birds.

One of the most famous auspices is the one which is connected with the founding of Rome. Once the founders of Rome, Romulus and Remus, arrived at the Palatine Hill, the two argued over where the exact position of the city should be. Romulus was set on building the city upon the Palatine, but Remus wanted to build the city on the strategic and easily fortified Aventine Hill. The two agreed to settle their argument by testing their abilities as augurs and by the will of the gods. Each took a seat on the ground apart from one another, and, according to Plutarch, Remus saw six vultures, after which Romulus saw twelve. The two clashed over whether the preference of the gods was indicated by Remus seeing vultures before Romulus did, or by Romulus seeing twelve vultures while Remus saw six. Vultures were pre-eminent in Roman augury, furnishing the strongest signs an augur could receive from a wild bird. They were subject to protective taboos and also called sacred birds.

== History ==
According to unanimous testimony from ancient sources, the use of auspices as a means to decipher the will of the gods was more ancient than Rome itself. The use of the word is usually associated with Latins as well as the earliest Roman citizens. Though some modern historians link the act of observing Auspices to the Etruscans, Cicero accounts in his text De Divinatione several differences between the auspicial of the Romans and the Etruscan system of interpreting the will of the gods. Cicero also mentions several other nations which, like the Romans, paid attention to the patterns of flying birds as signs of the gods' will but never mentions this practice while discussing the Etruscans.

Though auspices were prevalent before the Romans, Romans are often linked with auspices because of their connection to Rome's foundation and because Romans established rules for the reading of auspices that helped keep it an essential part of Roman culture. Stoics, for instance, maintained that if there are gods, they care for men, and that if they care for men they must send them signs of their will. The Philistines practiced augury as far back as 740 BCE and c. 686 BCE as declared by Isaiah 2:6 in the Hebrew Bible. Yet augury was first systematized by the Chaldeans according to the Jewish Encyclopedia. Auspices are also noted in book XV of the The Odyssey.

== Position of the augur ==
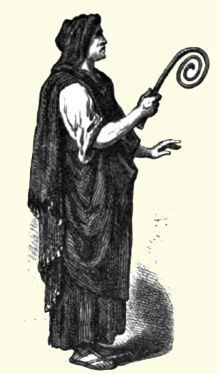
Roman augur with a lituus, an augural wand, symbol of augurs and augury.

In ancient Rome, the appointment and inauguration of any magistrate, decisions made within the people's assembly and the advancement of any campaign, always required a positive auspicium. This auspicium was only considered effective for either one day or the period it takes for the action to be completed.

During Octavian's first consulship in 43 BCE, the positive auspicium corresponded to the spotting of twelve vultures, similar to Romulus. Unlike in Greece where oracles played the role of messenger of the gods, in Rome it was through birds that Jupiter's will was interpreted. Auspices showed Romans what they were to do, or not to do; no explanation for the decision was given except that it was the will of the gods. It would be difficult to execute any public act without consulting the auspices.

It was believed that if an augur committed an error in the interpretation of the signs, or vitia, it was considered offensive to the gods and often was said to have disastrous effects unless corrected. Elections, the passing of laws, and initiation of wars were all put on hold until the people were assured the gods agreed with their actions. The men who interpreted these signs, revealing the will of the gods were called augurs. Similar to records of court precedents, augurs kept books containing records of past signs, the necessary rituals, prayers, and other resources to help other augurs, especially members of the ruling aristocracy, to understand the fundamentals of augury.

Although augurs had the power to interpret the signs, it was ultimately the responsibility of the magistrate to execute consequent decisions, or withhold or debate judgment as to future actions. The magistrates were also expected to understand the basic interpretations as they were often expected to take the auspices whenever they undertook any public business.

Until 300 BCE only patricians could become augurs. It was believed that the Roman gods were the gods of the patricians only. As such, Plebeian assemblies were forbidden to take augury and hence had no input as to whether a certain law, war or festival should occur. Cicero, an augur himself, accounts how the monopoly of the patricians created a useful barrier to the encroachment of the populares. However, in 300 BCE a new law Lex Ogulnia, increased the number of augurs from four to nine and required that five of the nine be plebeians, for the first time granting the ability to interpret the will of the gods to lower classes. With this new power it was not only possible for plebeians to determine the gods' will in their favor but it was also now possible for plebeians to critique unfair interpretations by patricians.

== Clothing and equipment of the augur ==
The augurs typically wore the praetexta. However, in military settings, they would wear the trabea. They carried a lituus—a wand to mark out the templum for augury—and a capis, a clay vessel used for sacrifices. These two items were often depicted in the coins issued by augurs.

== Location of the augury ==
Auspices needed to be taken on Roman land. If the location was not Roman, it had to be consecrated before being used. On this land, the augur would mark an area in the sky, known as a templum, while facing south. The templum refers to a space in the sky marked off by imaginary lines. It also included a rectangular space on the ground, which had its boundaries marked by stationary objects that were announced aloud by the augur. A tent called a tabernaculum or templum minus would be set up for the augury to take place within.

Within Rome, already consecrated sites such as the Auguraculum on the Capitoline Hill were designated for auspices. In military camps, a similar area called augurale was used.

== Types of auspices ==
=== Ex avibus (from birds) ===
Though auspices were typically bird signs, not all birds in the sky were seen as symbols of the will of the gods. There were two classes of birds: Oscines, who gave auspices via their singing; and Alites, who gave auspices via how they flew. The Oscines included ravens, crows, owls and hens, each offering either a favorable omen (auspicium ratum) or an unfavorable depending on which side of the Augur's designated area they appeared on. The birds of the Alites were the eagle, the vulture, the avis sanqualis, also called ossifraga, and the immussulus or immusculus. Some birds like the Picus Martius, the Feronius, and the Parrha could be considered among the oscines and the alites. Every movement and every sound made by these birds had a different meaning and interpretation according to the different circumstances, or times of the year when it was observed.

=== Ex tripudiīs (from the "dance" (of birds feeding)) ===
These auspices were read by interpreting the eating patterns of chickens, and were generally used on military expeditions. Cicero shows that at one point, any bird could perform the tripudium [sacred dance], but that as the practice progressed it soon began customary to use only chickens. The chickens were kept in a cage under the care of the pullarius (keeper of the chickens) who, when the time came, released the chickens and threw at them some form of bread or cake. If the chickens refused to come out or eat, or uttered a cry, or beat their wings, or flew away, the signs were considered unfavourable. Conversely, if the chicken left its cage to feast so that something fell from its mouth and landed on the ground, these signs were termed tripudium solistimum (or tripudium quasi terripavium solistimum [from solum, the ground], according to the ancient writers), and were considered to be a favourable sign. The chickens were often starved so that later the divination would be in accordance with the wishes of those interested.

=== The flight of birds ===
For the Romans, the high flight of birds (praepes) was an auspicious omen, the low flight was less happy (infera).

=== Ex caelo (from the sky) ===
The observation and interpretation of thunder and lightning are the maximum auspicium sent by Jupiter. Whenever the natural phenomena of lightning and thunder are seen, it indicates that the comitia, an assembly summoned by a magistrate cannot be held. The nature of the omen was decided based on what direction lightning came from. Signs from the left were considered lucky, while signs from the right were unlucky.

=== Ex quadrupedibus (from a four-footed animal) ===
This type of divination is not used in auspices done officially for the state. It is usually practiced in private spaces. The appearance of any quadruped, including dogs, wolves, and horses, in 'a person's path, or in an unusual place', is taken as an augury.

=== Ex diris/signis (from the signs) ===
This includes any type of augury that is not included within the other four classes. It includes 'sneezing', 'stumbling', and other types of accidents that disrupt the silence of the temple. Whether or not these were considered ill omens depended on their relation to the issue, the proximity of the observer, or the interpretation of pontifices, haruspices, and the Sibylline books. Ex acuminibus, in which the occurrence of flames at the tips of the army's weapons were observed, was also considered an augury within this class. This practice was discontinued by the Hannibalic War.

Additionally, Ex diris could be used to postpone comitia meetings if a participant suffered from morbus comitialis, an epileptic fit.

=== Signs offered, requested or unsought ===
There were two classifications of auspices; impetrative (impetrativa, sought or requested) and oblative (oblativa, unsought or offered). Impetrativa were signs given in response to the augur's interpretation of the auspice. Oblativa were unexpected and unsought events which occurred either while the magistrate was either taking auspices, or while he debated their likely significance.

== See also ==
- Divination
