= Bardas =

9th-century Byzantine noble

- Kaisar
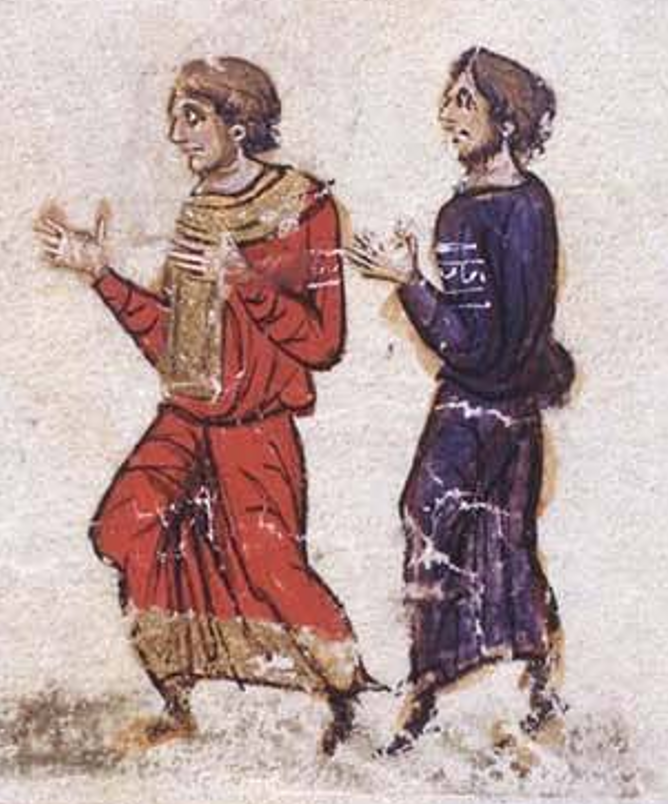
- Michael and Bardas as depicted in the 12th century Madrid Skylitzes

Caesar of the Byzantine Empire
- Reign: 22 April 862– 21 April 866
- Emperor: Michael III

Kouropalates
- Domestic of the Schools c. 858 – 861
- Monarch: Michael III
- Succeeded by: Antigonos

Magistros
- chartoularios tou kanikleiou c.855 – 858
- Monarch: Michael III

Patrikios
- In office 837 – c. 855
- Monarch: Theophilos
- Born: c. 810; Paphlagonia
- Died: 22 April 866; Miletus
- Wife: Theodosia (c. 855–862)
- Issue: Antigonus, Domestic of the Schools; Eirene
- Dynasty: Amorian
- Father: Marinos
- Mother: Theoktiste

Bardas (Greek: Βάρδας; died 21 April 866) was a Byzantine noble and high-ranking minister. As the brother of Empress Theodora, he rose to high office under Theophilos (r. 829–842). Although sidelined after Theophilos's death by Theodora and Theoktistos, in 855 he engineered Theoktistos's murder and became the de facto regent for his nephew, Michael III (r. 842–867). Rising to the rank of Caesar, he was the effective ruler of the Byzantine Empire for ten years, a period which saw military success, renewed diplomatic and missionary activity, and an intellectual revival that heralded the Macedonian Renaissance. He was assassinated in 866 at the instigation of Michael III's new favourite, Basil the Macedonian, who a year later would usurp the throne for himself and install his own dynasty on the Byzantine throne.

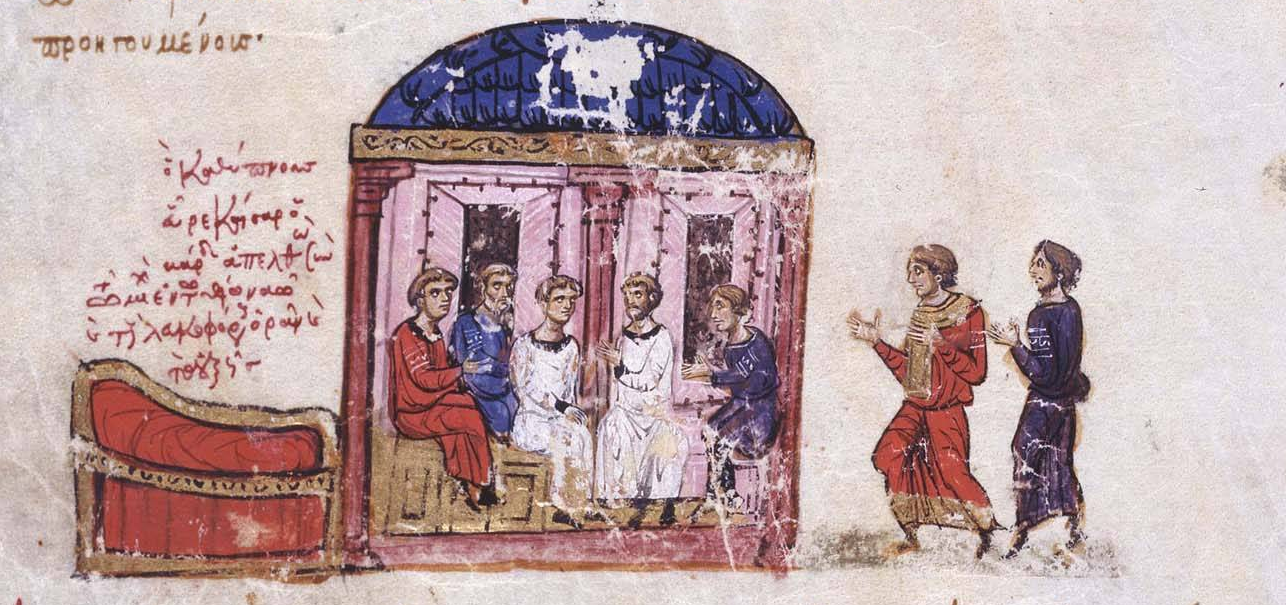
Caesar Bardas and his nephew in Hagia Sophia

== Biography ==
=== Early life ===
Bardas was born to the droungarios Marinos and Theoktiste, and was the elder brother of Empress Theodora, the wife of Emperor Theophilos, and of Petronas. Three other sisters, Maria, Sophia and Irene, are recorded by Theophanes Continuatus. The family was of Armenian origin and had settled in Paphlagonia. Some modern genealogists, including Cyril Toumanoff and Nicholas Adontz, have suggested a link of Bardas's family with the Armenian noble clan of the Mamikonian. According to Nina Garsoïan in the Oxford Dictionary of Byzantium, however, "[a]ttractive though it is, this thesis cannot be proven for want of sources."

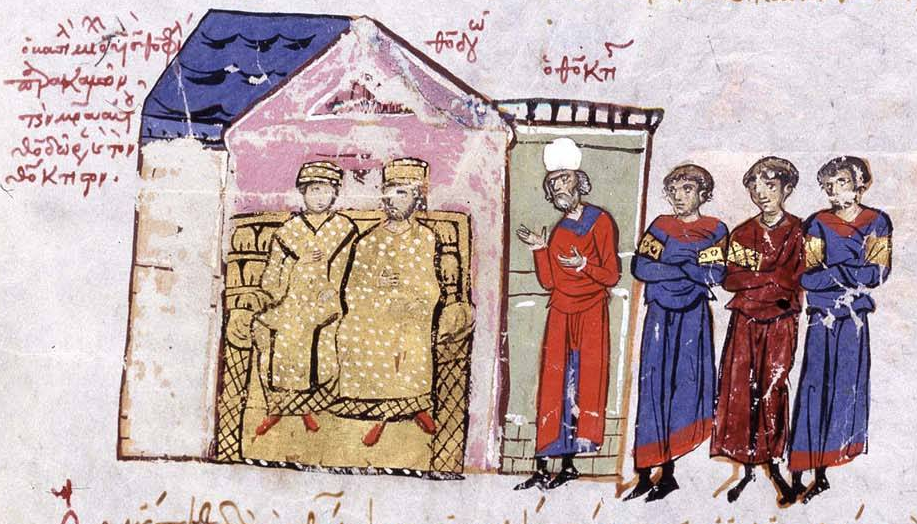
Michael III with Theodora and Theoktistos, from the Madrid Skylitzes

In 837, Theophilos raised him to the rank of patrikios and sent him together with the general Theophobos in a campaign against the Abasgians, but the Byzantines were defeated. With the death of Theophilos, his son Michael III (r. 842–867) ascended the throne. As he was only two years old, a regency council was set up headed by Theodora. Bardas and his brother Petronas, as well as their relative Sergios Niketiates, were also members, but it was the logothete Theoktistos who quickly established himself as Theodora's chief advisor. Bardas still played an active role in the early days of the regency, encouraging Theodora to abandon Iconoclasm for good and taking part in the investigations that led to the deposition of the pro-iconoclast patriarch John the Grammarian and the restoration of the veneration of icons in 843. Bardas was quickly sidelined by Theoktistos, however. According to Symeon the Logothete, Theoktistos blamed Bardas for the desertions that led to the Byzantine defeat in the Battle of Mauropotamos against the Abbasids in 844, even though the logothete himself had led the Byzantine army. As a result of these accusations, Bardas was exiled from Constantinople for an undetermined period of time.

Following Bardas's exile and the death of Sergios, Theoktistos ruled supreme alongside Theodora for a decade. In 855, Michael III turned fifteen and thus came nominally of age. His mother and Theoktistos arranged a bride show and selected Eudokia Dekapolitissa as his bride, disregarding Michael's attachment to his mistress, Eudokia Ingerina. Bardas used Michael's resentment for the high-handed manner in which he was treated, and began to turn him against the regency. With Michael's backing, Bardas was allowed to return to the capital, and on 20 November 855, Theoktistos was murdered. This was possibly done at the emperor's behest, for Bardas is said to have favoured a more "elegant" removal of his rival.

=== Ascendancy and fall ===
With the death of Theoktistos, the regency was at an end; in early 856, Michael proclaimed his assumption of full imperial power, and in 857 Theodora was forced to retire to the Gastria Monastery. Nevertheless, as Michael was more interested in his pleasures and his continuing affair with Eudokia Ingerina, Bardas now became the de facto regent of the Empire. By c. 858 he was promoted to the highest state offices (magistros and chartoularios tou kanikleiou), followed by his promotion to kouropalates—according to Symeon the Logothete, this happened after a failed assassination attempt masterminded by Theodora—and finally, on Holy Wednesday (22 April 862), to caesar. The dominance of Bardas is corroborated by non-Byzantine sources: al-Tabari records that Arab envoys negotiated with Bardas, rather than the emperor, and Bar Hebraeus writes that during an audience with an Arab embassy, Michael did not utter a single word, with his "cousin" (most likely Bardas) speaking on his behalf. Petronas also emerged from obscurity at the same time, becoming strategos of the Thracesian Theme and leading a series of successful raids against the Arabs.

Although later sources are critical of his character, describing him as vain, avaricious and power-hungry, his capabilities as an administrator are widely acknowledged. Thus Bardas founded the Magnaura School with seats for philosophy, grammar, astronomy and mathematics, supported scholars like Leo the Mathematician and promoted the missionary activities of Cyril and Methodius to Greater Moravia. He also scored a number of successes against the Arabs in the East, culminating in the decisive Battle of Lalakaon in 863, and enforced the Christianization of Bulgaria by Byzantine missionaries. The Patria of Constantinople praise him also for his building activity, but aside from a church dedicated to Saint Demetrius outside the city itself, most of the buildings attributed to him were probably the work of Basil I the Macedonian (r. 867–886).

In 858, Bardas deposed patriarch Ignatios and appointed Photios, well-educated but a layman, in his stead. Later chronicles report that Ignatios had excluded Bardas from communion because he maintained an incestuous relationship with one of his daughters-in-law, but the real reason for Ignatios's deposition was probably the patriarch's staunch refusal to tonsure Empress Theodora against her will, as demanded by Bardas. The irregular elevation of Photios, however, alienated Pope Nicholas I, who refused to recognize it. Coupled with competition between Rome and Constantinople over their missionary activities in and jurisdiction over Moravia and Bulgaria, relations with the papacy remained tense.

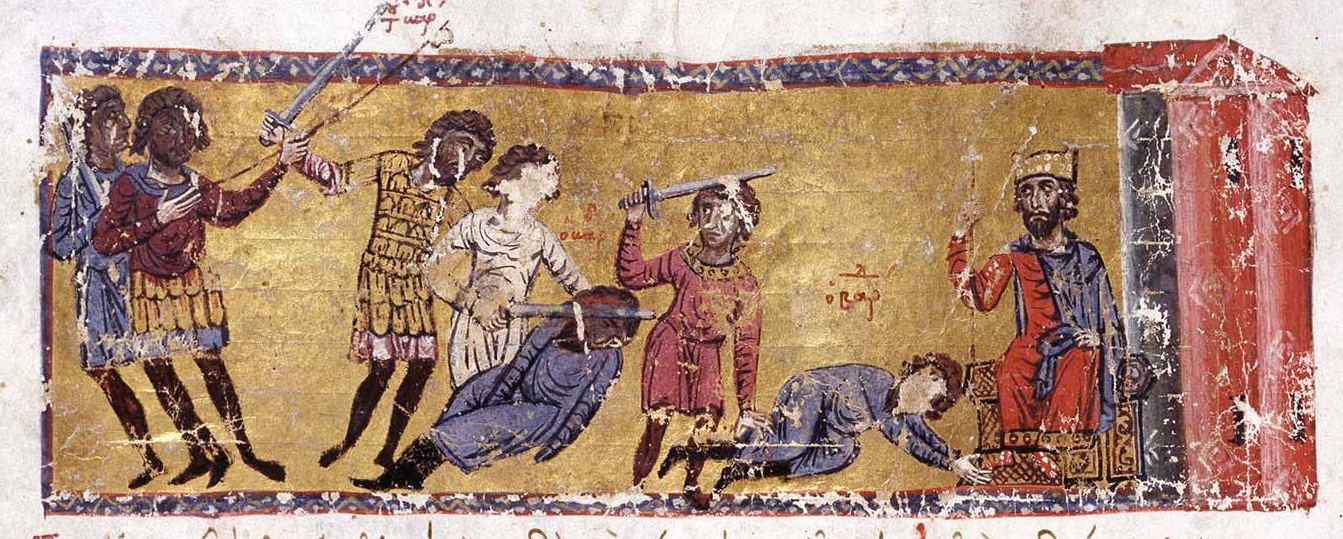
The assassination of Bardas, with Michael looking on, from the Madrid Skylitzes

Despite his great authority, Bardas's control over his nephew was not absolute: after he managed to persuade him to dismiss his old chamberlain (parakoimomenos), Damian, Michael appointed to the post not one of Bardas's own protégés, but his favourite companion, the ruthlessly ambitious Basil the Macedonian. Bardas's own position was further weakened in early 866, when Michael learned that Eudokia Ingerina was pregnant with the future Leo VI: hitherto Bardas stood to succeed to the throne if anything should happen to the emperor, but now Michael had a direct heir. Instead of divorcing his wife and marrying his long-time mistress, however, Michael married off Ingerina to Basil instead, who divorced his own wife first. In spring of the same year, Bardas began assembling a large-scale expedition against the Saracen stronghold of Crete. Accompanied by Michael, Basil and the court, Bardas made for Miletus, where the army was assembling. There, on 21 April 866, he was murdered by Basil, ostensibly for plotting against the emperor.

The campaign was abandoned while Michael and Basil returned to Constantinople, where Michael adopted his friend and made him co-emperor. In September 867, Basil had Michael III assassinated as well, ending the Amorian dynasty and inaugurating the Macedonian period of Byzantine history.

=== Family ===
Bardas was married twice. From his unknown first wife, who must have died before 855, he had a son named Antigonos, a daughter named Irene, an unnamed son, and another daughter who married the logothete Symbatios (although she may be identical with Irene). Some time around 855, Bardas married for a second time, but divorced this wife, by the name of Theodosia, in 862. Of Bardas's sons, Antigonos was appointed Domestic of the Schools while still a boy and still held the post at the time of his father's murder, while little is known about the other son, except that in 858 he was given the hand of his father's mistress, whom Bardas had discarded in order to marry Theodosia, and was appointed monostrategos ("single-general") of the Empire's European themes. Bardas's second daughter was married to the patrikios and logothete Symbatios. Symbatios participated in the plot to assassinate Bardas, hoping to succeed him. He rose in revolt when Basil became co-emperor, but was defeated, mutilated and exiled.

== Sources ==
- Kazhdan, Alexander, ed. (1991). The Oxford Dictionary of Byzantium. Oxford and New York: Oxford University Press. ISBN 0-19-504652-8.
- Lilie, Ralph-Johannes; Ludwig, Claudia; Pratsch, Thomas; Zielke, Beate (2013). Prosopographie der mittelbyzantinischen Zeit Online. Berlin-Brandenburgische Akademie der Wissenschaften. Nach Vorarbeiten F. Winkelmanns erstellt (in German). Berlin and Boston: De Gruyter.
- Treadgold, Warren (1997). A History of the Byzantine State and Society. Stanford, California: Stanford University Press. ISBN 0-8047-2630-2.
