= Petronas (general) =

9th-century Byzantine military leader and aristocrat

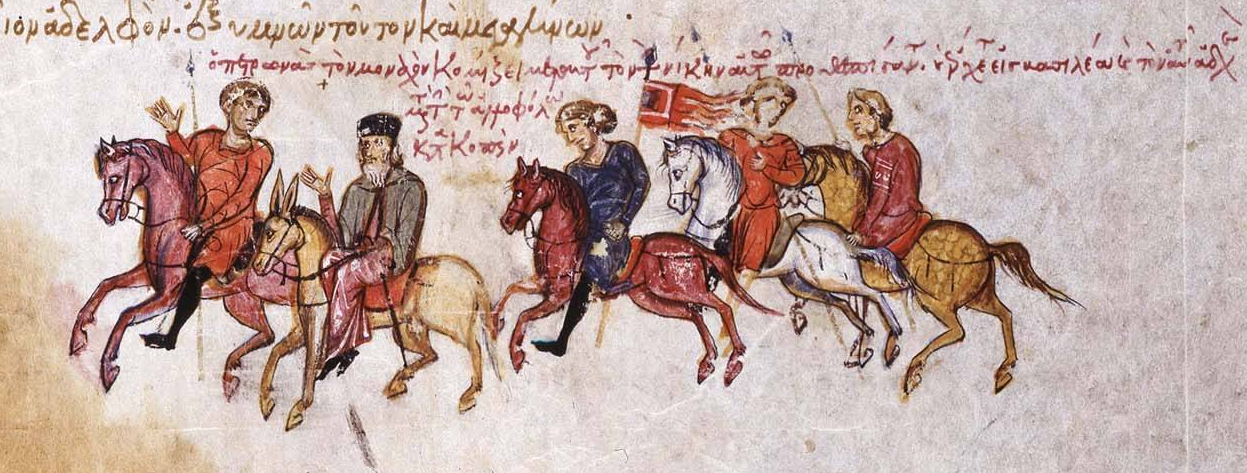
- Petronas (far left) with John the Monk. Miniature from the Madrid Skylitzes.

Magistros
- Domestic of the Schools c. September 863 – 11 November 865
- Monarch: Michael III
- Preceded by: Antigonos
- Succeeded by: Antigonos

Patrikios
- Strategos of Thrakesion; 855 – September 863
- Monarch: Michael III
- Droungarios of the Watch c. 835 – c. 840
- Monarch: Theophilos

Personal details
- Born: c. 812
- Died: 11 November 865
- Resting place: Gastria Monastery
- Children: Theoktiste; Marinos

Military service
- Allegiance: Byzantine Empire
- Years of service: c. 835 – 865
- Battles/wars: Arab–Byzantine wars; Battle of Lalakaon

Petronas (Ancient Greek: Πετρωνᾶς; died November 11, 865) was a notable Byzantine general and leading aristocrat during the mid-9th century. Petronas was a brother of Empress Theodora and hence brother-in-law of Emperor Theophilos, under whom he advanced to the high court rank of patrikios and the post of commander of the Vigla guard regiment. After Theophilos' death, he played a role in the ending of Iconoclasm, but was sidelined along with his brother Bardas during the minority of his nephew, Michael III, when power was held by the regent Theoktistos. In 855, Petronas and Bardas encouraged Michael III to seize control of the government: Theoktistos was murdered, Theodora banished to a monastery, Bardas became Michael's chief minister, and Petronas was tasked with the war against the Arabs. In 863, he scored a crushing victory at the Battle of Lalakaon, a feat which marked the gradual beginning of a Byzantine counter-offensive in the East. Promoted to the rank of magistros and the office of Domestic of the Schools, he died in 865.

== Biography ==
Petronas was born to the droungarios Marinos and Theoktiste, and was the younger brother of Bardas and Empress Theodora, the wife of Emperor Theophilos. Three other sisters, Kalomaria, Sophia, and Irene, are recorded by Theophanes Continuatus.

Under Theophilos, he was appointed commander (droungarios' of the guard regiment (tagma) of the Vigla, and raised to the high court rank of patrikios. In 842, as Theophilos lay dying, Petronas and the eunuch Theoktistos carried out the execution of the patrikios Theophobos, a former Khurramite convert and general, whose troops had rebelled and proclaimed him emperor at Sinope some years before. Despite his kinship with Theophilos, the tale is told that the Emperor once had Petronas stripped naked and flogged in public because he had built a palace that overshadowed the house of a widow, in contravention of the law. The palace itself was then torn down, and both the building materials and the plot were left to the widow.

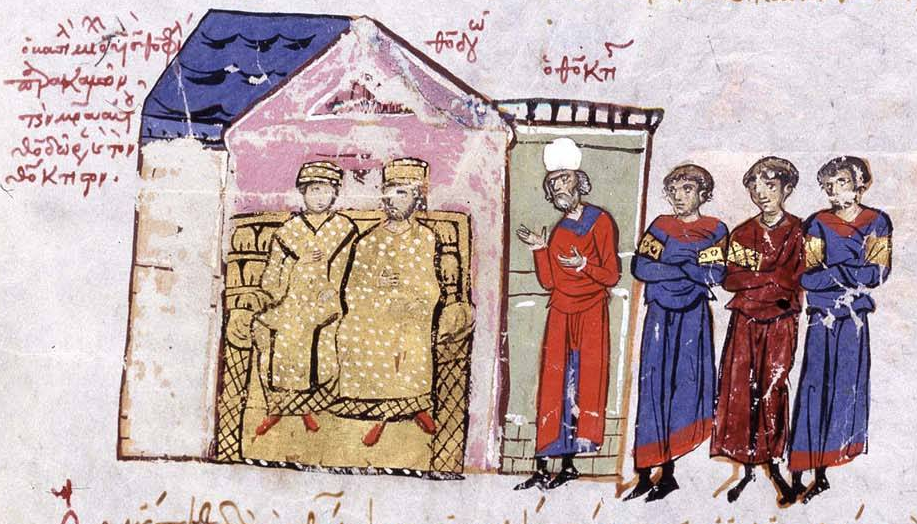
Michael III with Theodora and Theoktistos, from the Madrid Skylitzes

When Theophilos died in 842, Theodora was left as regent to her infant son, Michael III. A regency council was set up headed by Theodora, along with Petronas and Bardas and their relative Sergios Niketiates. Petronas is said to have urged Theodora to rescind Theophilos's iconoclastic policies, which eventually resulted in the restoration of the veneration of images in the so-called "Triumph of Orthodoxy" on 11 March 843. Soon after that, Petronas and Bardas were successfully sidelined by the logothetes Theoktistos, while Niketiates was killed in an expedition against the Cretan Saracens, leaving the eunuch minister the dominant figure throughout Theodora's regency.

In 855, however, Michael III turned fifteen and thus came nominally of age. The young ruler began resenting the dominance of his mother and of Theoktistos, especially after they selected Eudokia Dekapolitissa as his bride, disregarding Michael's attachment to his mistress, Eudokia Ingerina. Supported by his uncles Bardas and Petronas, Emperor Michael had Theoktistos seized and killed in late 855, while Petronas undertook the confinement of the empress and her daughters into a monastery. Bardas was now raised to the rank of Caesar and became the effective governor of the Byzantine Empire. In this position, he displayed remarkable energy and ability, and amongst the most important of his policies was a more aggressive stance against the Arabs in the East. Consequently, Petronas was appointed strategos of the powerful Thracesian Theme. On his first campaign, against the Paulicians of Tephrike in 856, he plundered his way through the emirate of Melitene and the Paulician lands to Samosata and Amida in Upper Mesopotamia. After penetrating deeper into Arab territory than any Byzantine commander since the beginning of the Muslim conquests, he returned victorious with many captives.

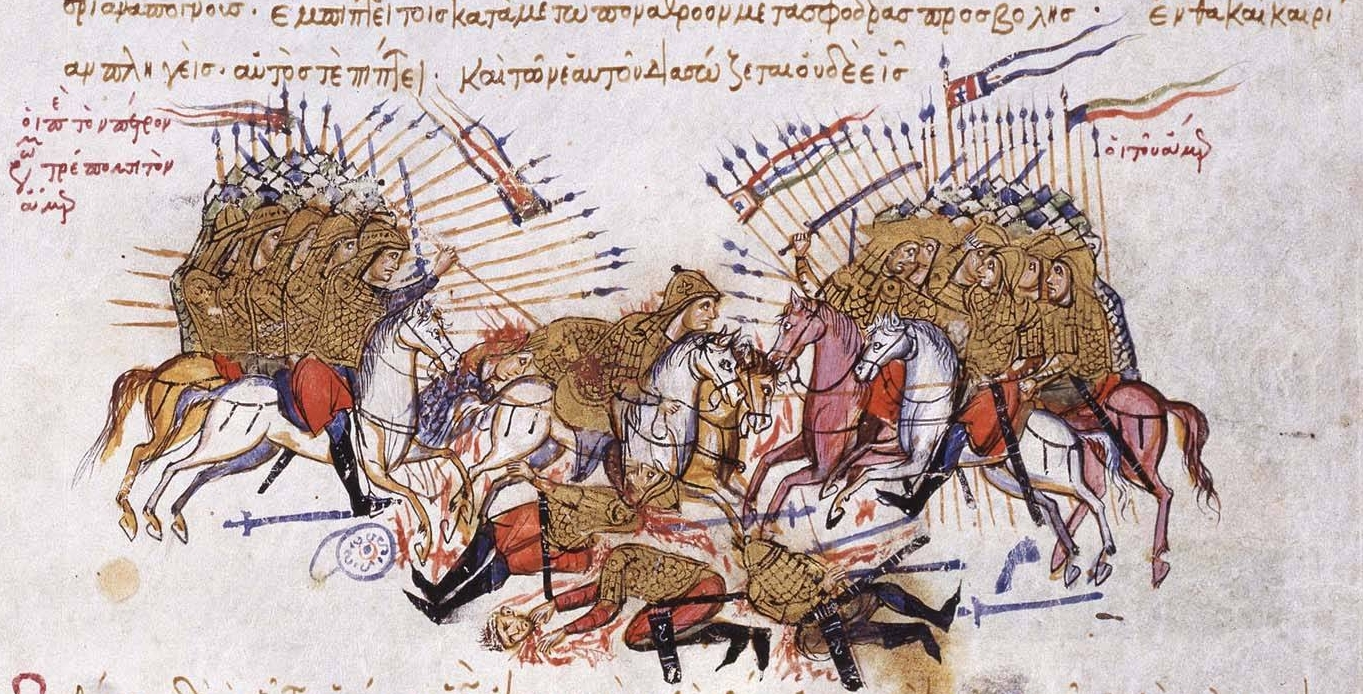
Clash between Byzantines and Arabs at the Battle of Lalakaon.

In 863, an Arab army, led by the emir of Melitene, Umar al-Aqta (r. 830s–863), raided deep into Byzantine territory, reaching the Black Sea coast at Amisos. Petronas was placed in charge of all Byzantine troops assembling to confront the invasion, and through a brilliant coordination effort, three separate forces managed to converge on the Arab army, encircle it, and destroy it at the Battle of Lalakaon on September 3, 863. Petronas carried his defeated enemy's head to Constantinople, where he was honored with a triumphal entrance by his nephew. Soon after, he was raised to the supreme court rank of magistros and the position of Domestic of the Schools (commander-in-chief of the army).

The defeat of the Arabs and their Paulician allies became a turning point in the Arab–Byzantine wars. With this victory, Petronas and Bardas were able to secure their eastern borders, strengthen the Byzantine state, and set the stage for the Byzantine conquests of the 10th century. The Byzantine chroniclers add that the victorious general did not survive for long after his victory. A hagiography, written by a contemporary, claims that Petronas died on the same day as his spiritual father Saint Anthony the Younger, two years and two months after routing the Arab armies. He was buried in the Gastria Monastery, where his stone sarcophagus was placed opposite those of his sister, the Empress Theodora, and his nieces.

== Sources ==
- Jenkins, Romilly James Heald (1987). Byzantium: The Imperial Centuries, AD 610–1071. Toronto: University of Toronto Press. ISBN 0-8020-6667-4.
- Kazhdan, Alexander, ed. (1991). The Oxford Dictionary of Byzantium. Oxford and New York: Oxford University Press. ISBN 0-19-504652-8.
- Treadgold, Warren (1997). A History of the Byzantine State and Society. Stanford, California: Stanford University Press. ISBN 0-8047-2630-2.
- Whittow, Mark (1996). The Making of Byzantium, 600–1025. Berkeley and Los Angeles, California: University of California Press. ISBN 978-0-520-20496-6.
- Lilie, Ralph-Johannes; Ludwig, Claudia; Pratsch, Thomas; Zielke, Beate (2000). "Petronas". Prosopographie der mittelbyzantinischen Zeit: 1. Abteilung (641–867), Band 3: Leon (# 4271) – Placentius (# 6265) (in German). Berlin and Boston: De Gruyter. pp. 564–566. ISBN 978-3-11-016673-6.
