= Loros =

Ceremonial type of imperial Byzantine costume

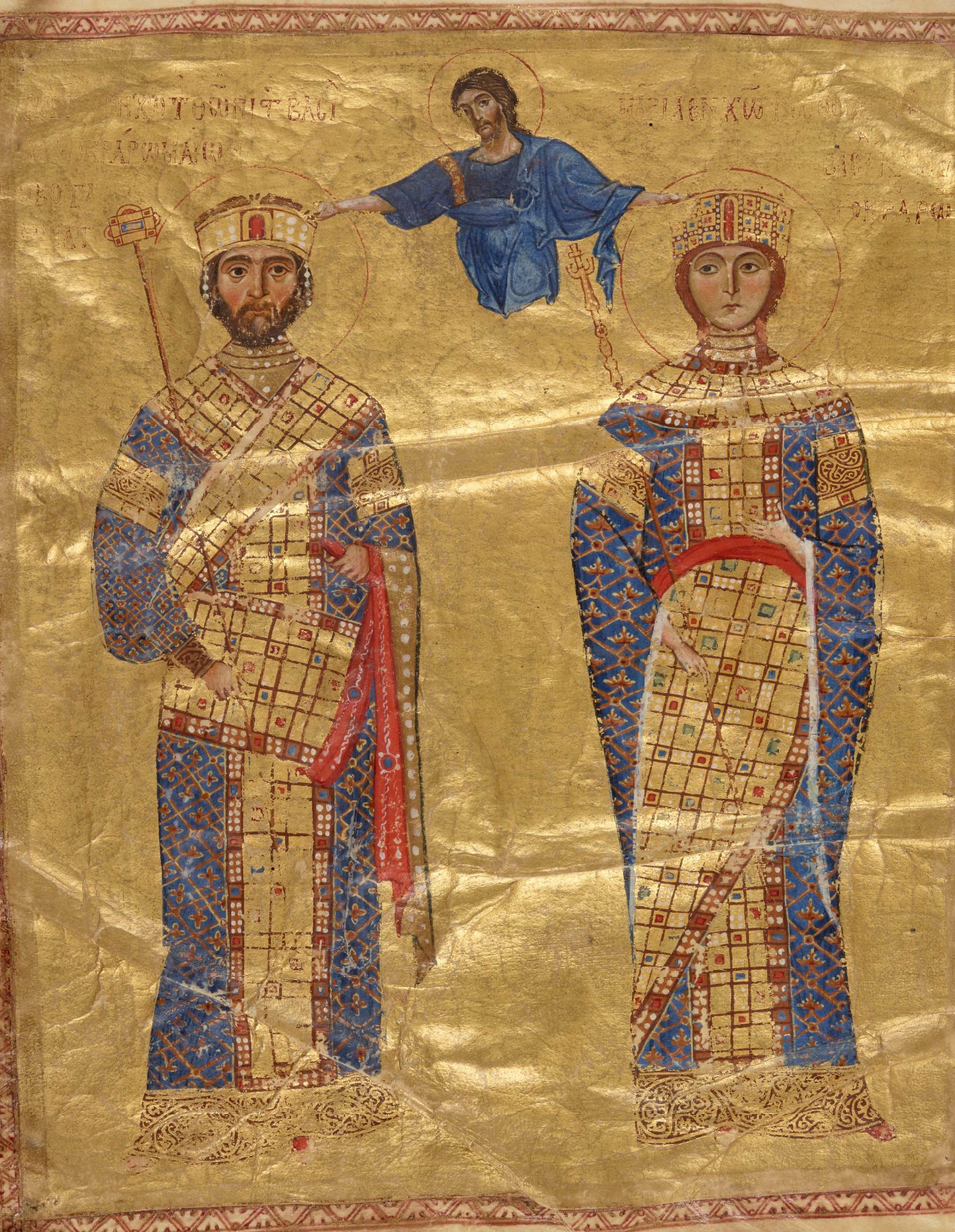
Emperor Nicephorus III and Empress Maria with the old male and new female styles

The loros (Greek: λῶρος, romanized: lôros) was a long, narrow and embroidered cloth, which was wrapped around the torso and dropped over the left hand. It was one of the most important and distinctive parts of the most formal and ceremonial type of imperial Byzantine costume, worn only by the Imperial family and a few of the most senior officials. It developed out of the trabea triumphalis of the Roman consuls. There were different male and female versions. Byzantine sources speak of the "loros costume" as the loros dictated the rest of the imperial outfit. The slightly less formal, and more secular, imperial costume, which was also that normally worn by high officials on official occasions, was the chlamys costume. Underneath either the loros or the chlamys were worn the divetesion (διβητήσιον), a long silk robe, and a tunic.

== Male ==
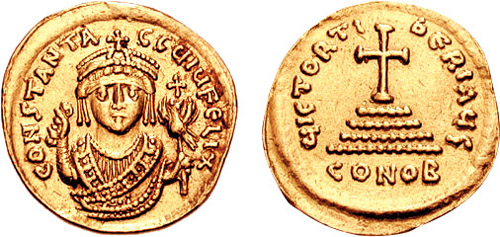
Obverse: A bust of Emperor Tiberius II Constantine facing, wearing a crown and consular robes with a loros, holding a mappa in his right hand and a cross on an eagle on sceptre in his left hand

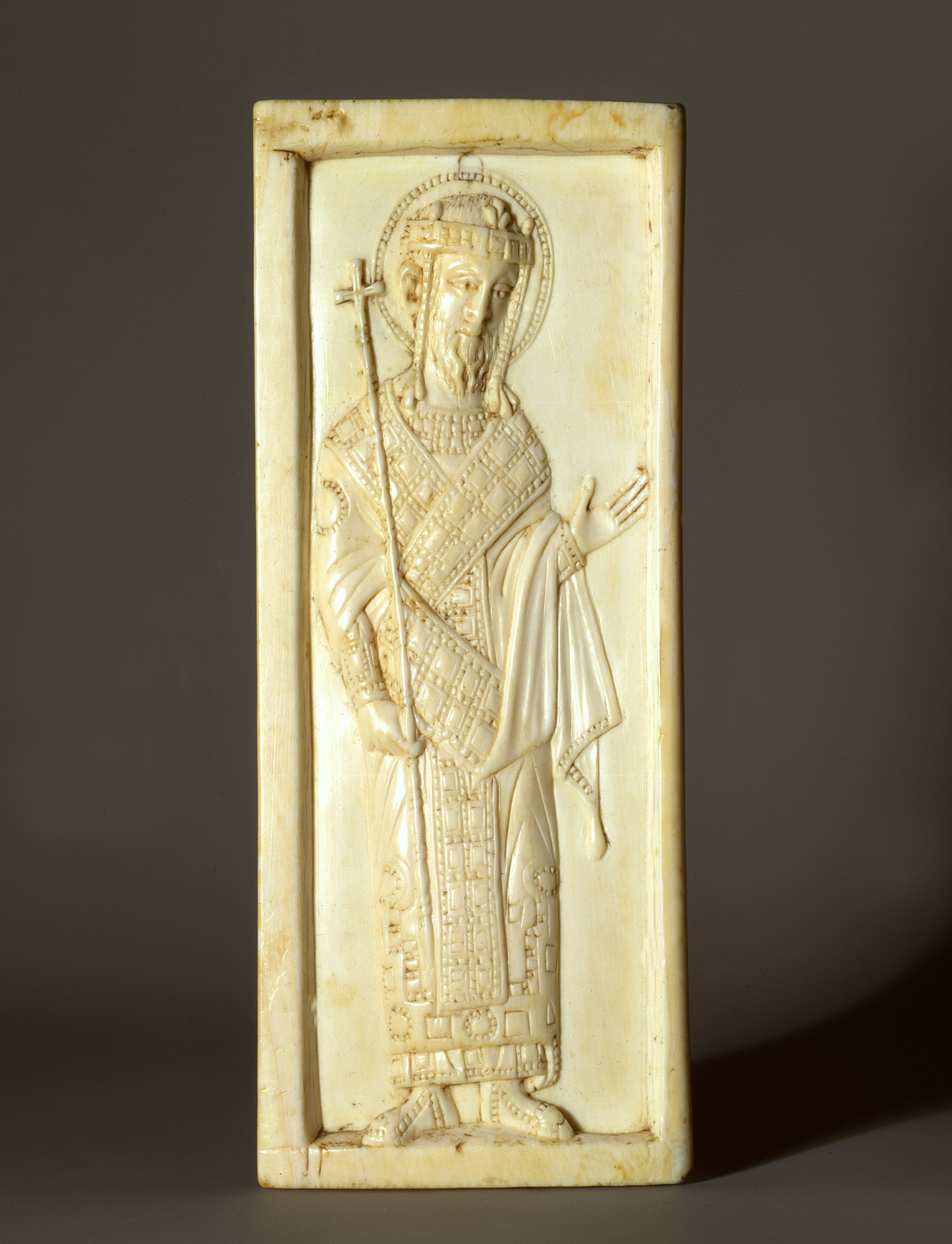
A mid-10th century ivory relief showing a Byzantine emperor wearing the traditional loros in a very accurate carving

The first representations of the loros are on coins from the reign of Tiberius II Constantine (r. 578 - 582 AD).

Other examples can be seen on coins minted by emperors like Justinian II (r. 685–695 and 705–711). Until the 10th century, the male loros was wrapped around the torso in a specific way, following the ancient trabea. However, increasingly from the 11th century, the loros acquired a new design. The new loros had a loop that went round the neck and was pulled on over the head. By the Komnenian dynasty, the old loros was completely abandoned, after a period when both designs are seen. By the 14th century the strip down the front may have been sewn onto the tunic beneath, and the loros may have been called a diadema instead. Despite the modifications, the loros was the most important part of the imperial costume up until the end of the empire in the 15th century.

Although in practice it was, according to the De Ceremoniis by Constantine VII, worn only in exceptional occasions such as on Easter Sunday, Pentecost, sometimes other feasts, and to receive important foreign visitors, the loros was an integral part of imperial portraiture. In earlier periods it was worn in triumphal processions.

The loros was also worn at Easter by the "twelve dignitaries", holders of the ranks of magistros and anthypatos, as well as by the Eparch of Constantinople and the zoste patrikia during the ceremonies of their promotion. It was said to symbolize the winding-sheet of Christ, with the officials as the Twelve Apostles. It is also worn by archangels in Byzantine art, which spread to medieval art in the West, as they were regarded as the high officials of God. It seems the loros-costume was not worn at the coronation of the Emperor, although he was given it in the course of the ceremony, and when crowned by Christ in art always wears it.

From the 13th century the loros began to be shown worn in imperial portraits of other Orthodox rulers, such those of Serbia, Georgia and the Armenian Kingdom of Cilicia. In the Bulgarian Gospels of Tsar Ivan Alexander, the tsar and his son both wear it. Westwards, a mosaic in the Church of Santa Maria dell'Ammiraglio shows King Roger II of Sicily wearing "the raiment of a Byzantine emperor", including a loros. The Stola, a 14th-century garment in the Imperial Regalia of the Holy Roman Empire, was made to be worn like a loros; misinterpretation caused later generations to wear it in the manner of a priest's stole, although it was too long for the purpose.

== Female ==
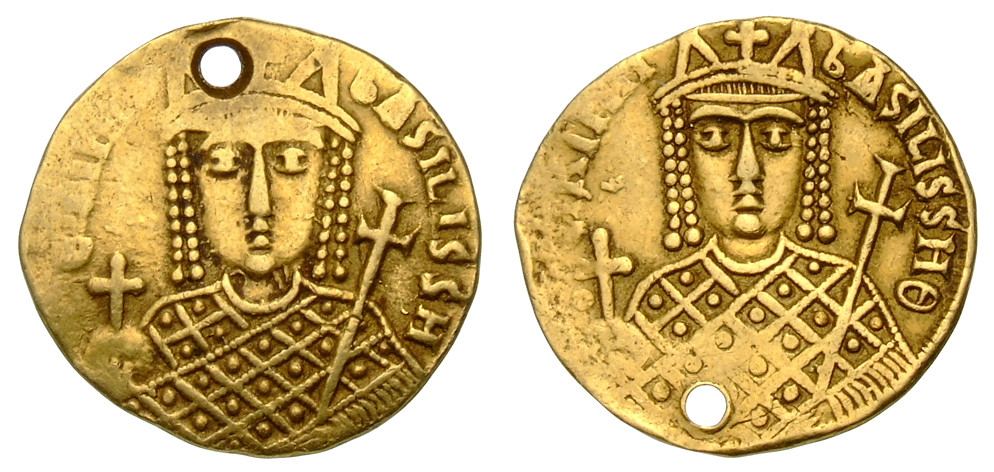
Crowned empress Irene wearing a loros, holding a globe with a cross (sphaira) in her right and a cross scepter in her left hand

At first empresses wore essentially the same form as emperors, but from around the 9th century a new style appears. The hanging end was longer and much broader, and after reaching down to the ankles turned upwards to be folded over the left forearm, or fastened or tucked into the belt. The wide end has the appearance in paintings of a round-topped shield tapering to a point, at an oblique angle. In the 13th century this shield shape is no longer seen, and the female form returns to being that of the now modified male one for the last phase of the empire. Empresses also wore a wide jewelled "superhumeral" collar in matching styles to the loros, and perhaps attached to it. This was the distinctive garment of empresses and also worn on other occasions, and copied by other upper-class women; the modified male loros created much the same effect.

== Gallery ==
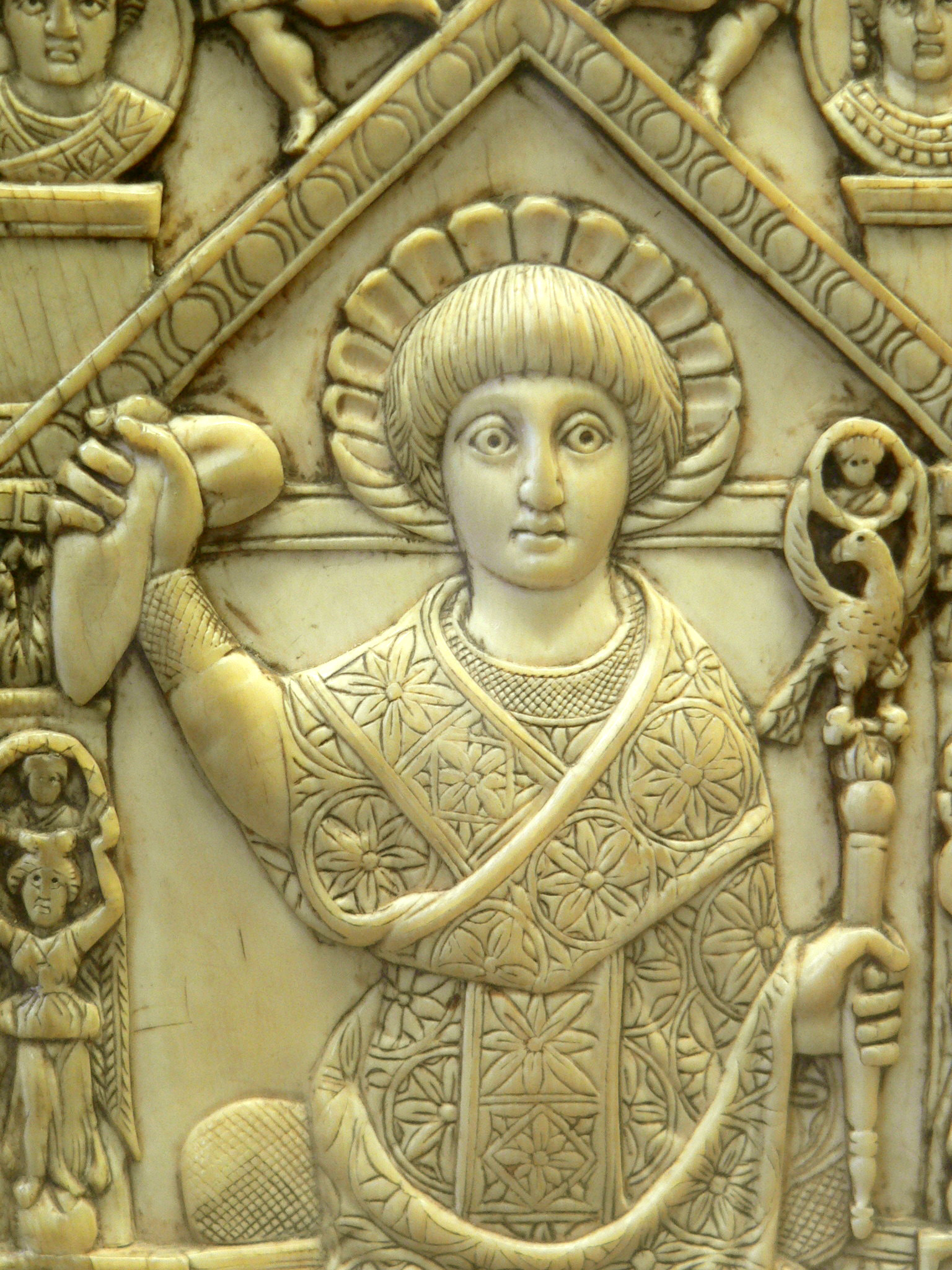
A Roman consul wearing the trabea triumphalis, 517 AD

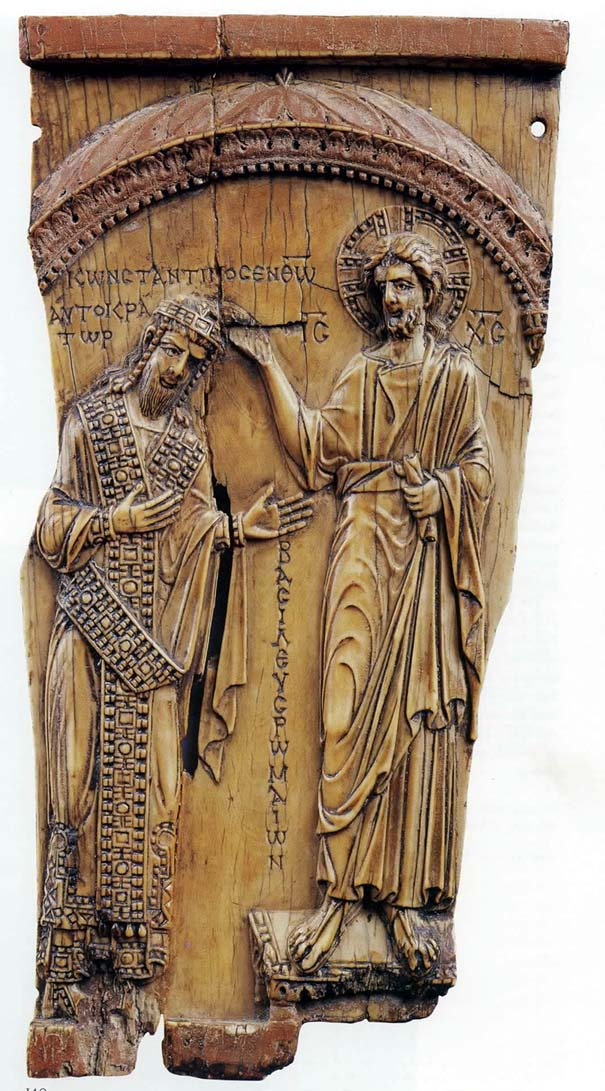
Constantine VII wearing the traditional loros though not accurately wrapped, 945 AD

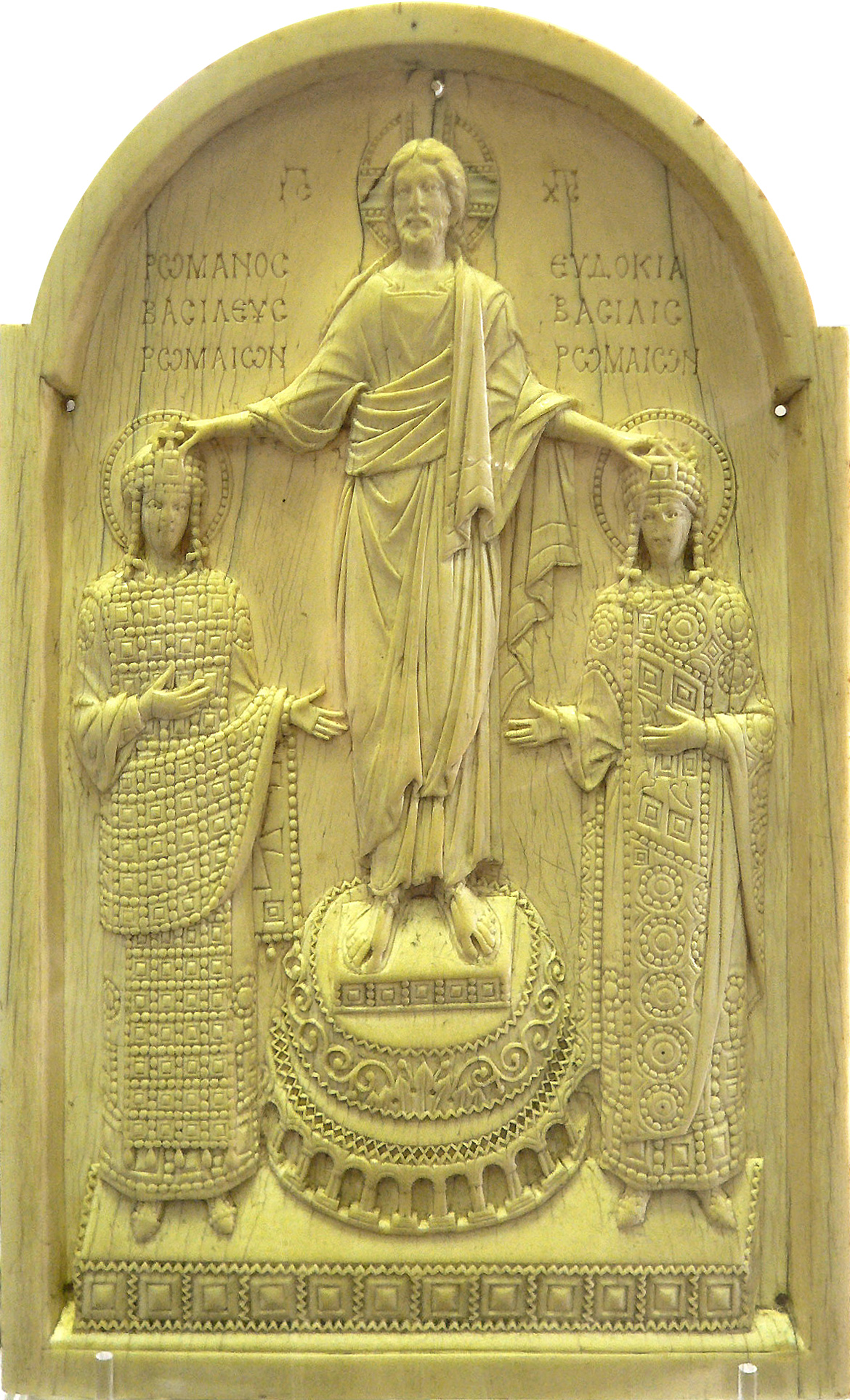
The Romanos Ivory showing emperor Romanos wearing an accurate modified loros, probably 945–949 AD

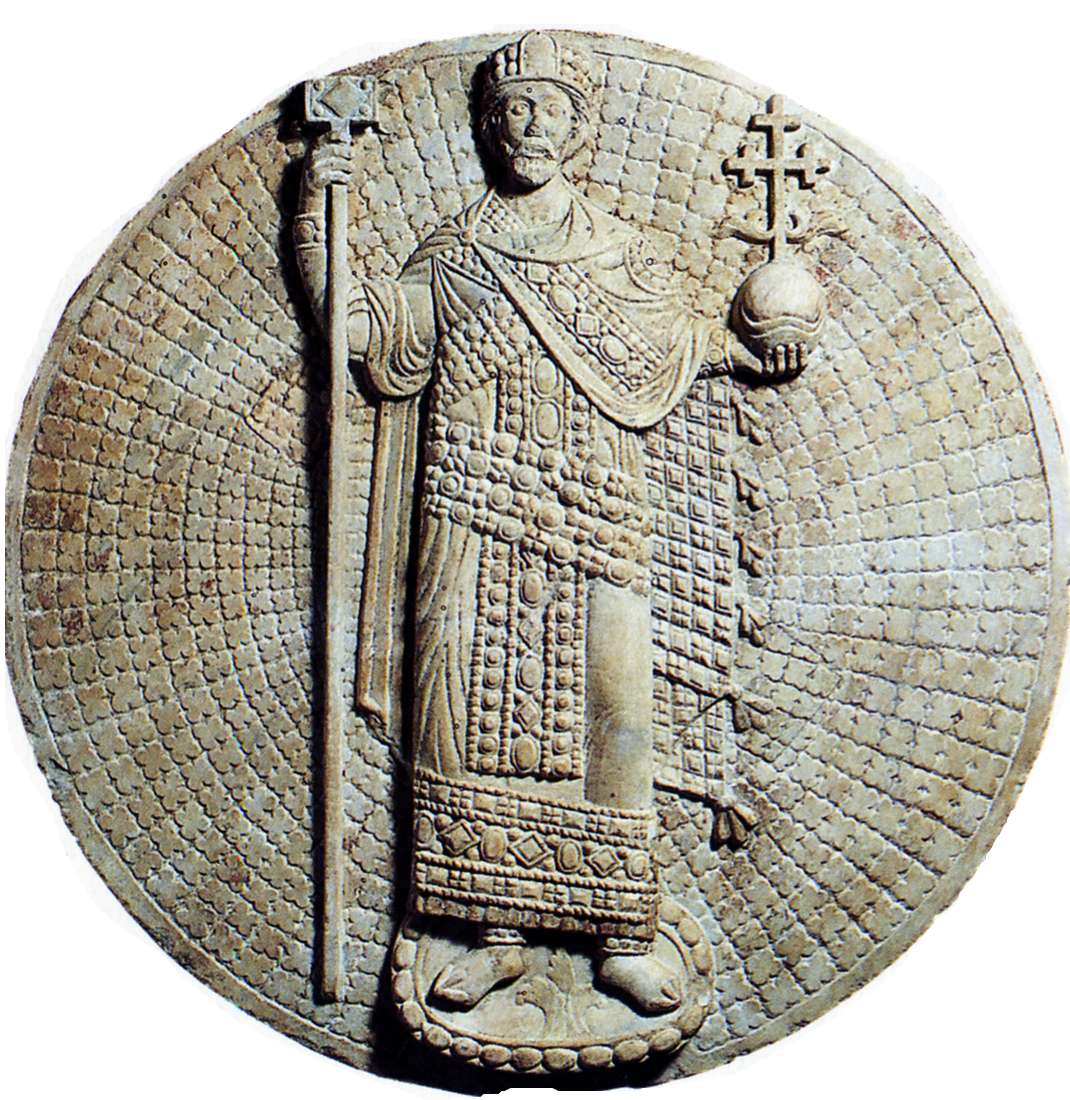
John II Komnenos. Although the relief is anachronistic and the emperor wears simultaneously both the loros and the chlamys (the coat on top), something which was never the practice, the wrapping of the loros beneath is carved accurately, 1143 AD.

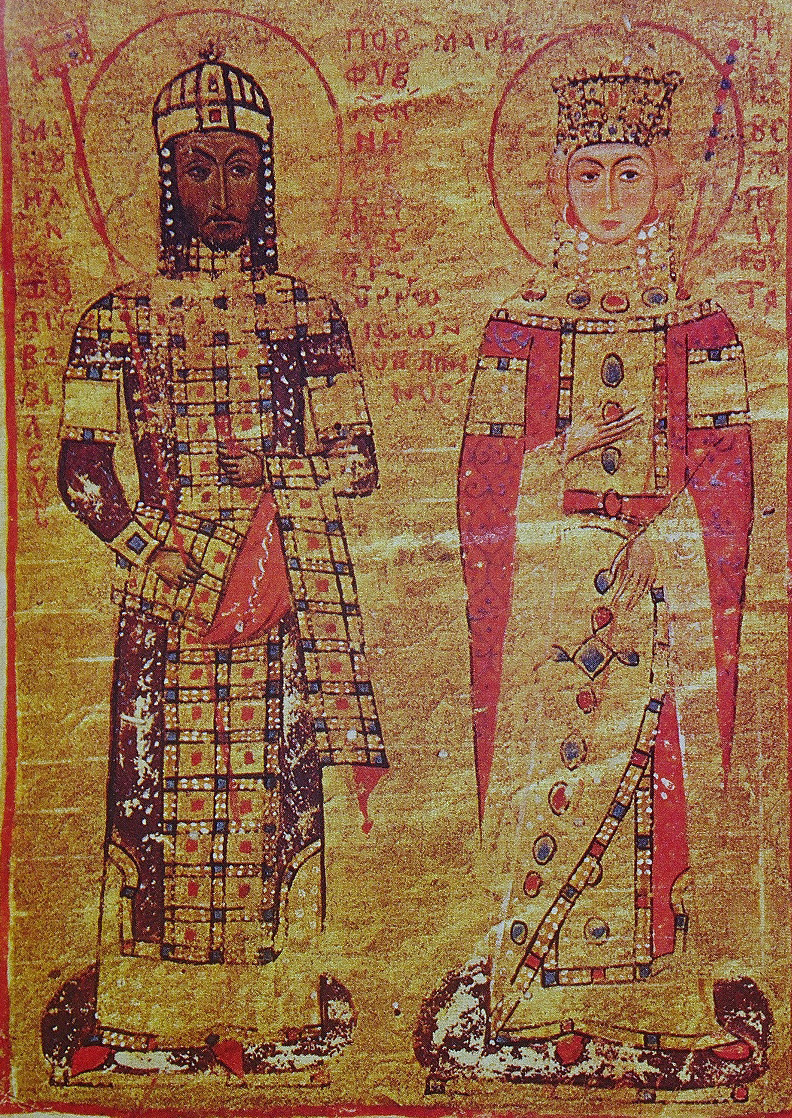
Manuel I Komnenos wearing the modified loros, 12th century

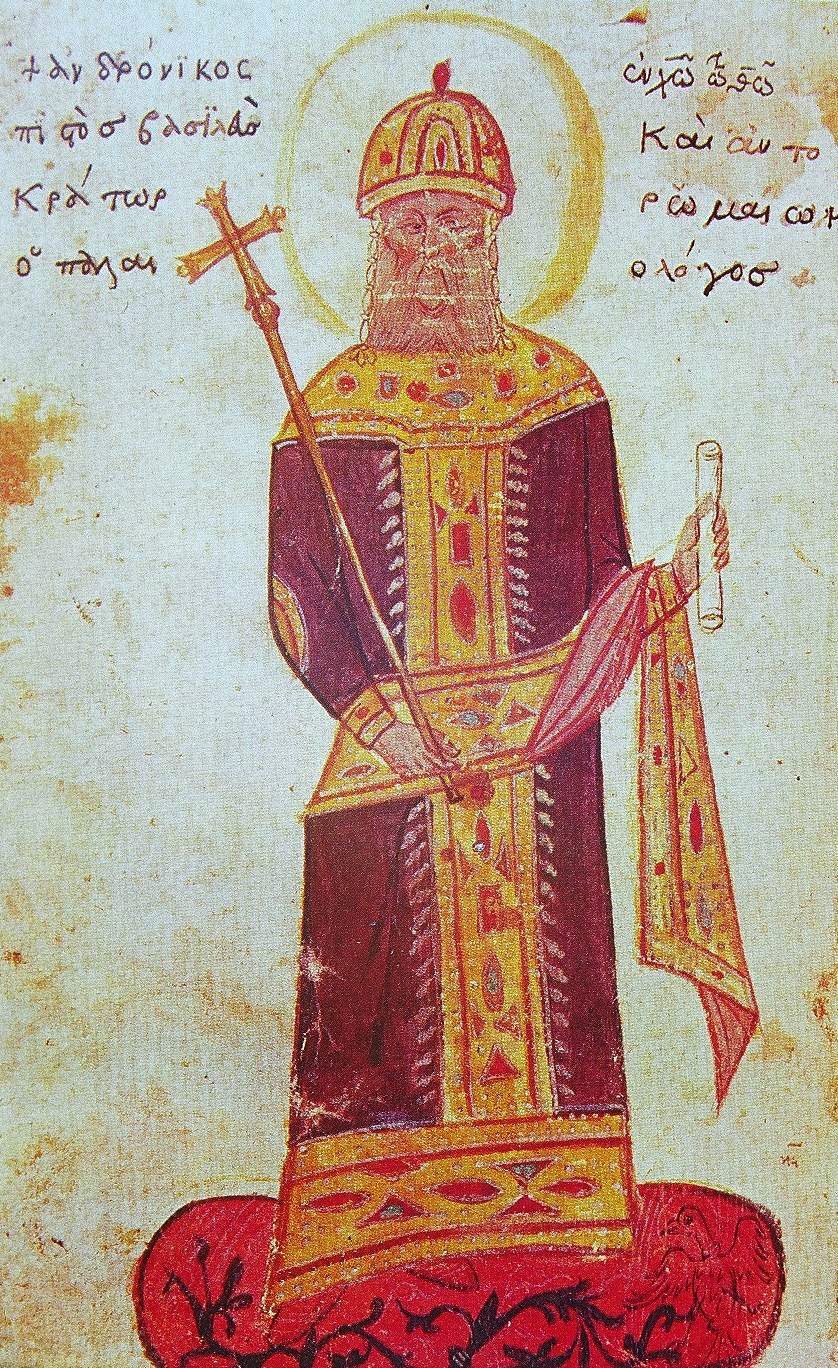
Andronikos II Palaiologos, r. 1272–1328

Gospels of Tsar Ivan Alexander, 1355–56, portrait of the Bulgarian tsar and his family

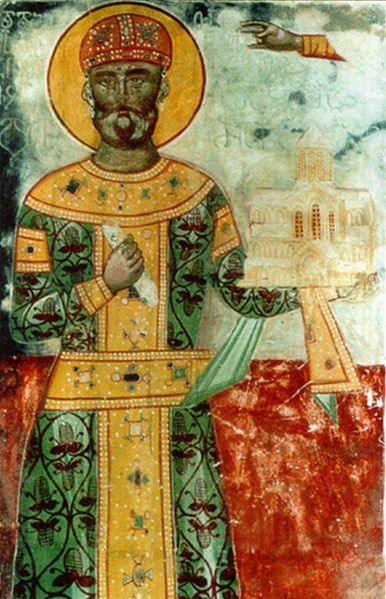
A fresco of Georgian King David IV (r. 1089–1125) from Gelati Monastery

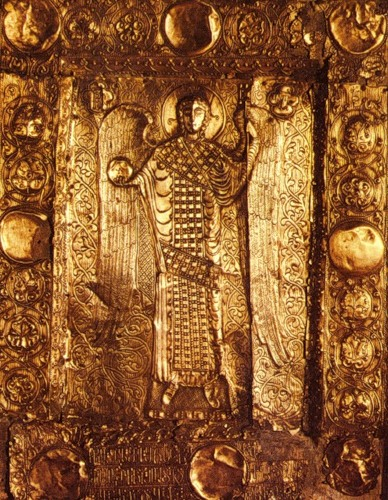
A Georgian icon of the Archangel Gabriel

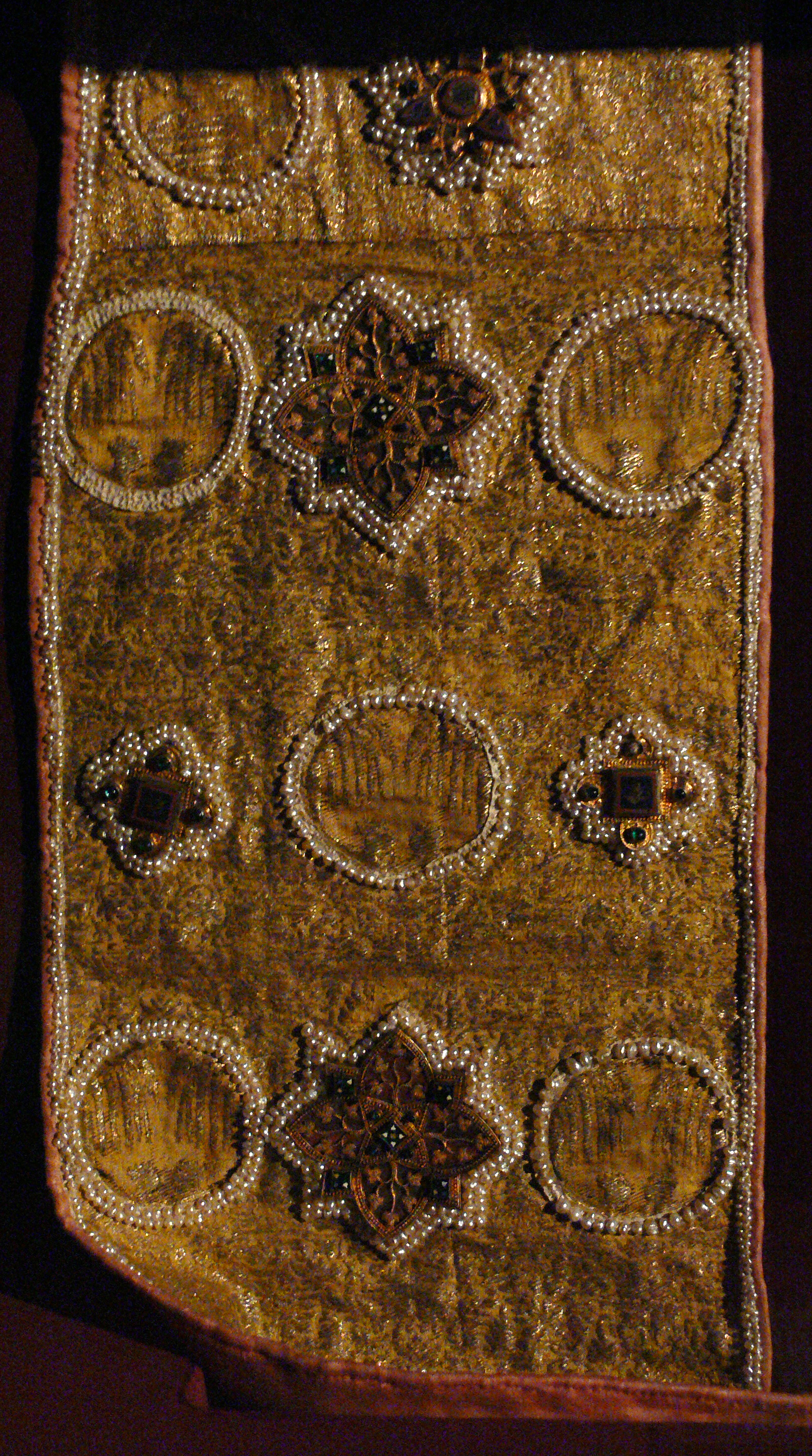
Detail of the Stola of the Holy Roman Empire, a Western adaptation of the loros; preserved in the Kunsthistorisches Museum in Vienna
