= Sancaktar Hayrettin Mosque =

Mosque in Istanbul, Turkey

Sancaktar Hayrettin Mosque Sancaktar Hayrettin Câmîi
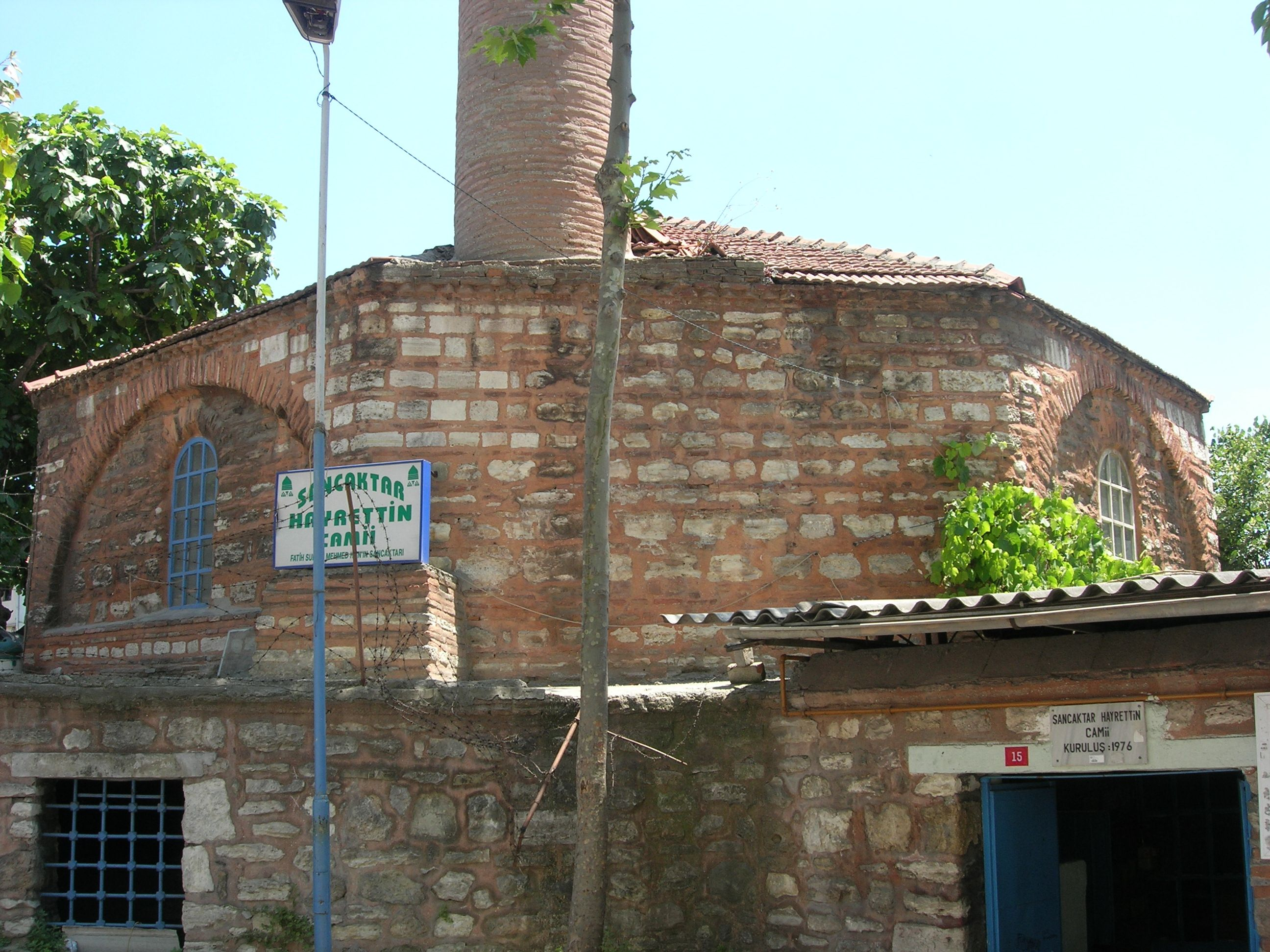
- The mosque viewed from the north

- Location in the Fatih district of Istanbul

Religion
- Affiliation: Sunni Islam
- Year consecrated: Shortly after 1453

Location
- Location: Istanbul, Turkey
- Coordinates: 41°00′09.90″N 28°56′04.80″E

Architecture
- Type: church
- Style: Byzantine
- Completed: 14th Century

Specifications
- Minaret: 1
- Materials: brick, stone

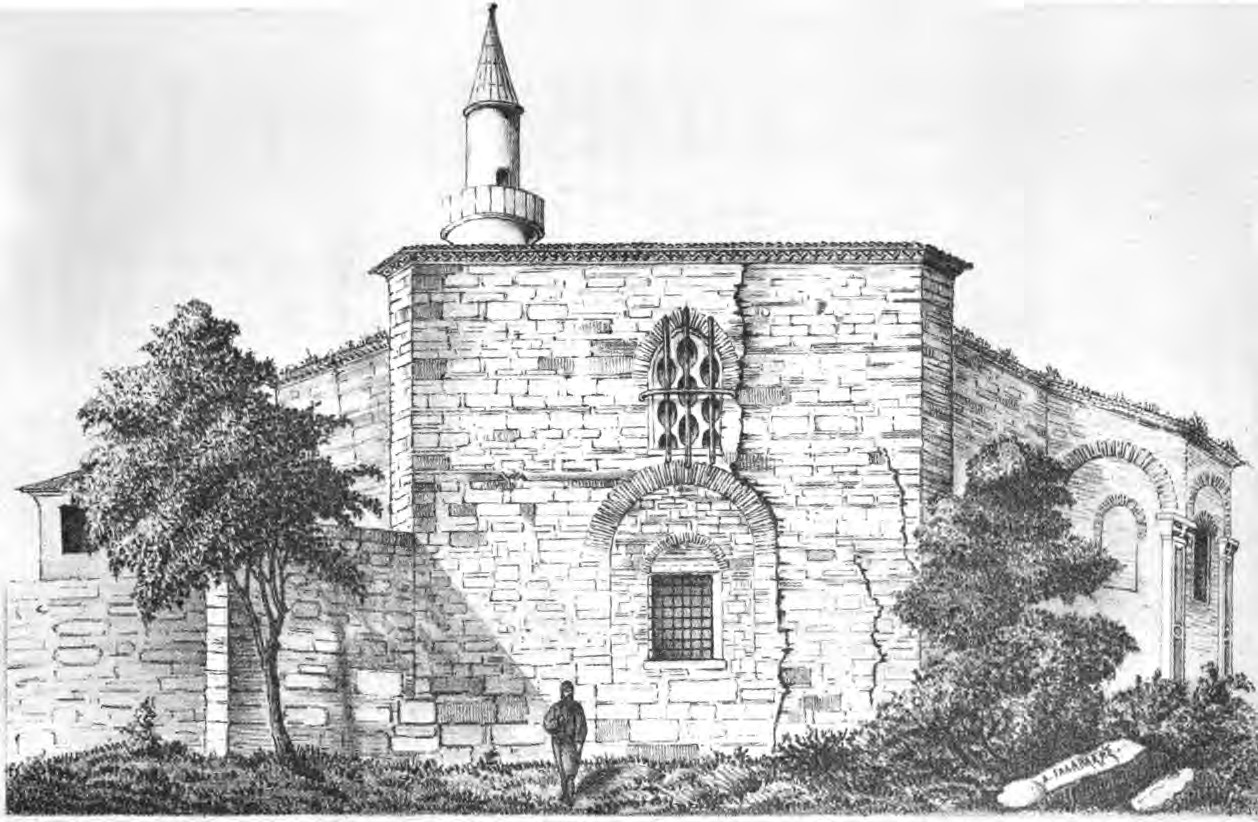
The mosque as it appeared in the 1870s.

Sancaktar Hayrettin Mosque (Turkish: Sancaktar Hayrettin Câmîi; also Sancaktar Hayrettin Mescidi, where Mescit is the Turkish word for a small mosque, or Sancaktar Mescidi) is part of a former Eastern Orthodox monastery converted into a mosque by the Ottomans. It is generally believed that the small building belonged to the Byzantine Monastery of Gastria (Greek: Μονῆ τῶν Γαστρίων, Monē tōn Gastríōn, meaning "Monastery of the Vases"). The edifice is a minor example of Palaiologan architecture in Constantinople, and is important for historical reasons.

== Location ==
The medieval structure, choked by artisan shops, lies in Istanbul, in the district of Fatih, in the neighborhood of Kocamustafapaşa (historically Samatya), on Teberdar Sokak, about five hundred meters north east of the Kocamustafapaşa station of the suburban railway line between Sirkeci and Halkalı.

== History ==
The origin of this building, which lies on the southern slope of the seventh hill of Constantinople and overlooks the Sea of Marmara, is not certain. Traditional accounts state that in the year 325 Helena, the mother of Constantine I, coming back from Jerusalem with the True Cross and entering the City through the Port tou Psomatheou, left in this place some vases ("Gastria") containing aromatic herbs collected on Calvary. She subsequently founded a nunnery at the site. In reality, no monastery was established in Constantinople before the last quarter of the fourth century, so this has to be considered only a legend.

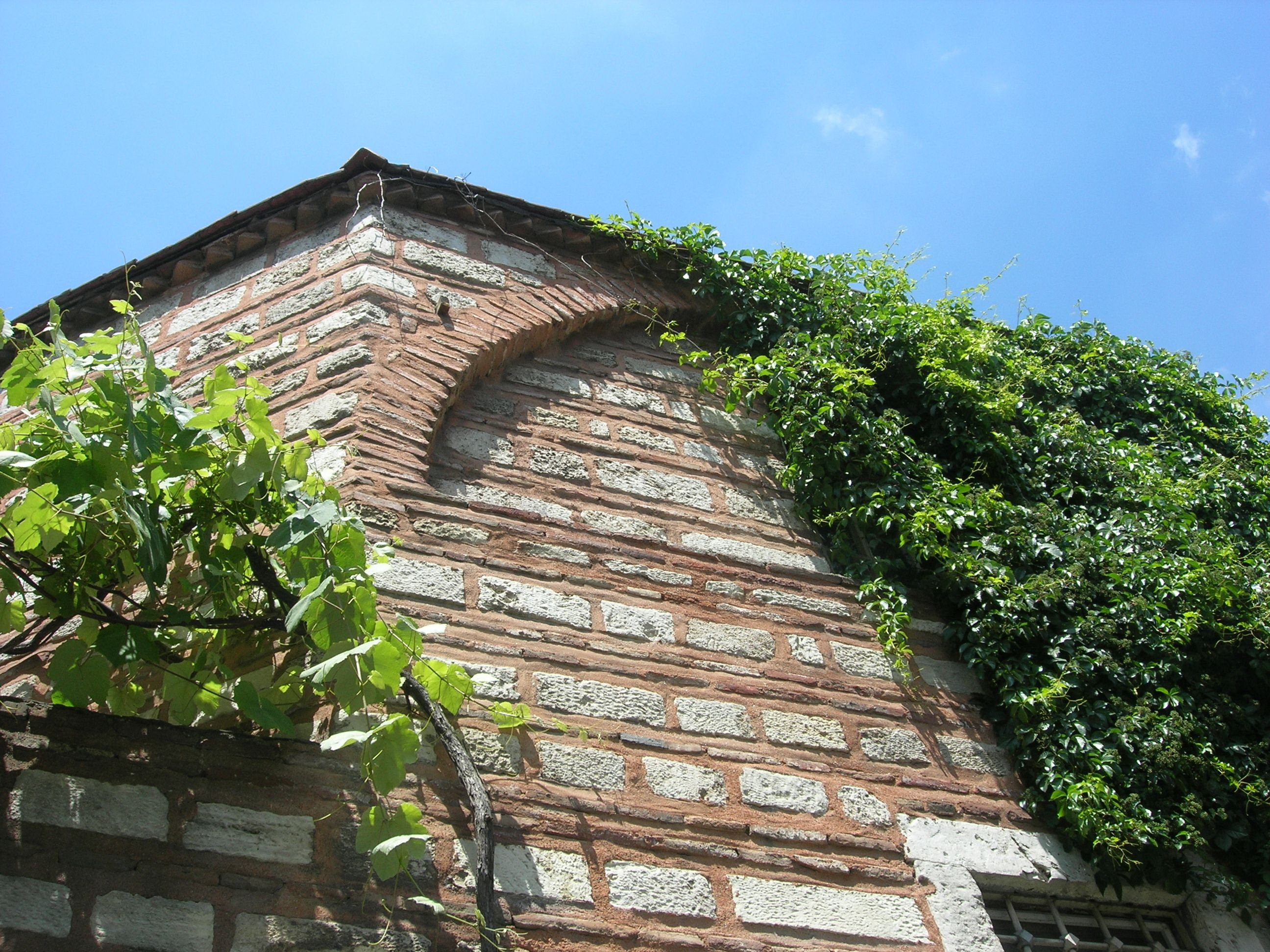
The southeast side with a particular of the brickwork.

The nunnery of Gastria was first mentioned at the beginning of the ninth century. At that time Theoktiste, mother of Empress Theodora (wife of Emperor Theophilos and restorer of the cult of the icons) bought in the quarter of Psamathia a house from the Patrician Niketas (possibly Saint Nicetas the Patrician), and established there a nunnery. The title of Ktētorissa (foundress), together with the property of the buildings, was inherited by her daughter Theodora. Together with her daughters Thekla, Anna, Anastasia and Pulcheria, Theodora was removed to the monastery by her brother Bardas after her deposition as regent for her son, Michael III, in 856. All of them were forced to accept the tonsure, although her eldest daughter, Thekla, was eventually recalled by Michael to serve as a mistress for his favourite, Basil the Macedonian. The 10th-century emperor Constantine VII Porphyrogennetos writes in his book De Ceremoniis that the church of the nunnery served also as a mausoleum for the members of Theodora's family. The Empress, her brother Petronas, her mother and her three daughters were all buried there.

The last mention of Gastria before 1453 comes from a Russian pilgrim, who visited the City during the second quarter of the fifteenth century. He remembers a nunnery placed near the Golden Gate, where the relics of Saint Euphemia and Saint Eudokia were venerated. This building could well be identified with Gastria.

Shortly after the Fall of Constantinople, Hayrettin Effendi, Sancaktar (standard-bearer) of Sultan Mehmed II, converted the building into a mescit (oratory) and was buried there. The charter for this religious foundation has not survived. The 1894 Istanbul earthquake, which had its epicentre under the Sea of Marmara, partially destroyed the mosque, which was restored only between 1973 and 1976.

== Description ==
Due to its small dimension, the building cannot be identified with the church of the nunnery, but rather with a martyrion (burial chapel) or a mausoleum, which can be dated to the Palaiologan period (14th century). The building had the shape of an irregular octagon with a cross-shaped interior and an apse oriented toward East. Light penetrates into the building through windows opened on alternate sides, which illuminate the arms of the cross-shaped interior. Each window is inside a blind arch which spans the whole side. The masonry uses alternate courses of brick and ashlar, giving to the exterior the polychromy typical of the Palaiologan period. Remnants of walls still present in the northwest and south sides before the restoration showed that the building was not isolated, but connected with other edifices. A minaret has also been added to the restored building.

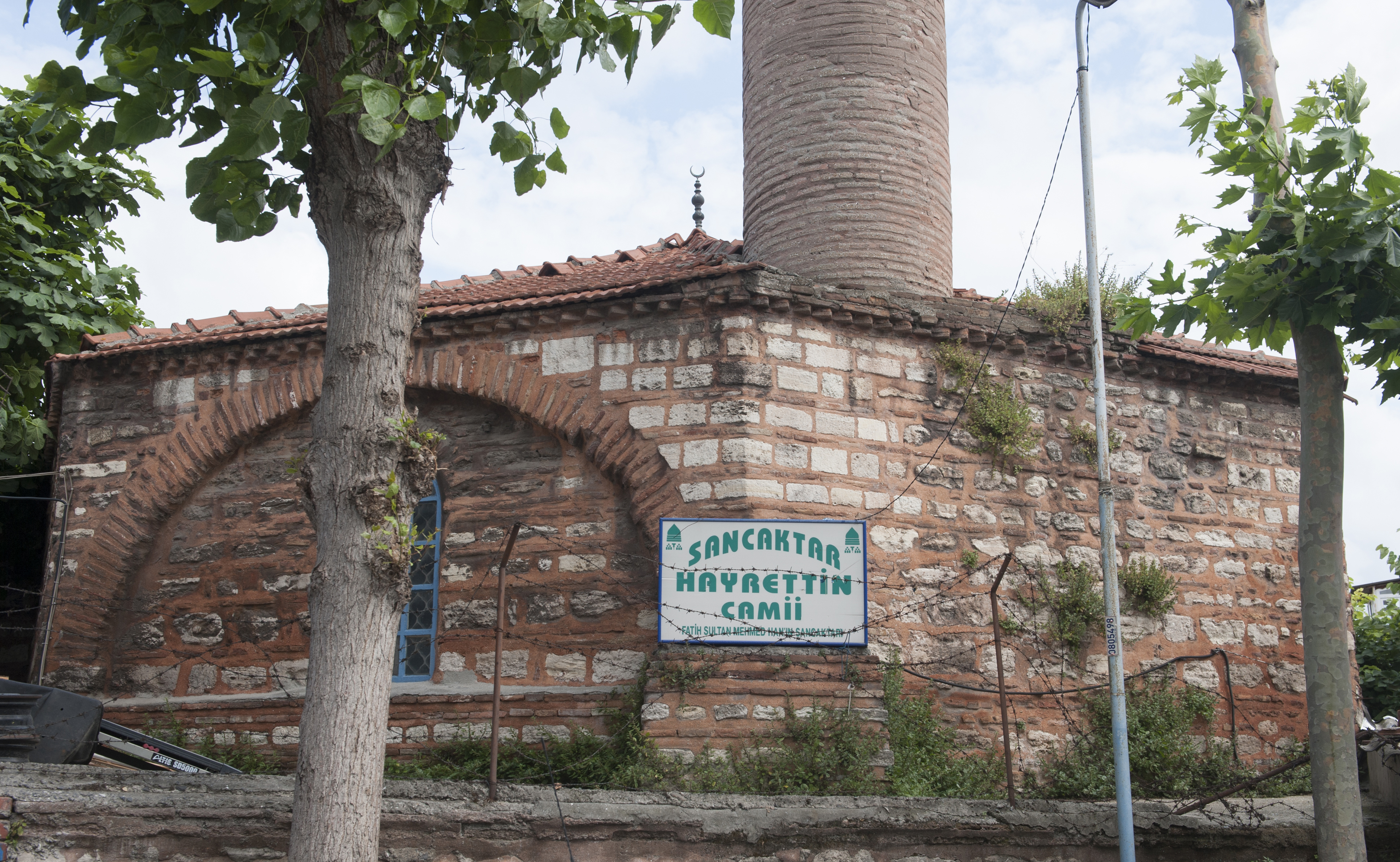
Sancaktar Hayrettin Mosque exterior

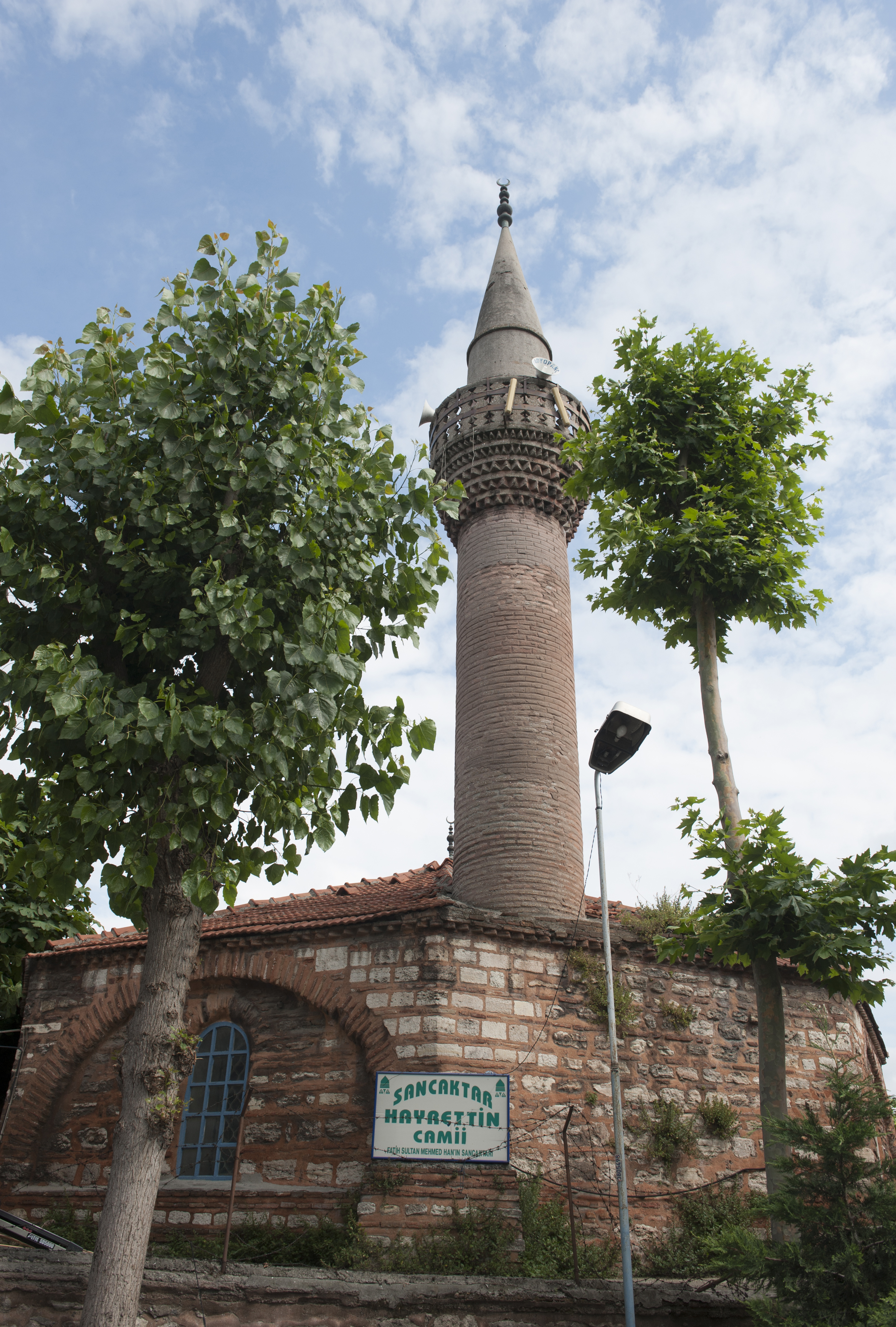
Sancaktar Hayrettin Mosque exterior

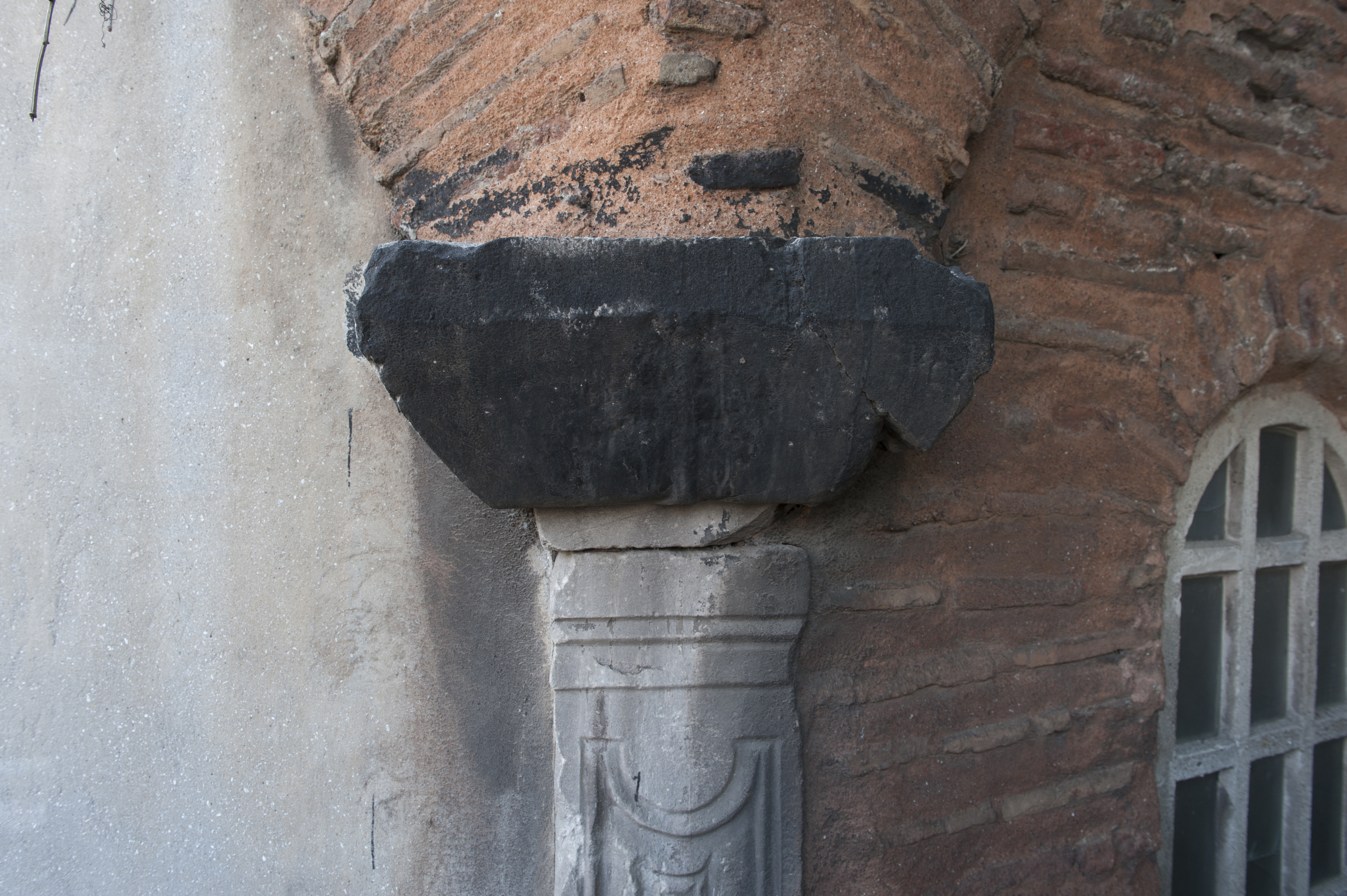
Sancaktar Hayrettin Mosque column

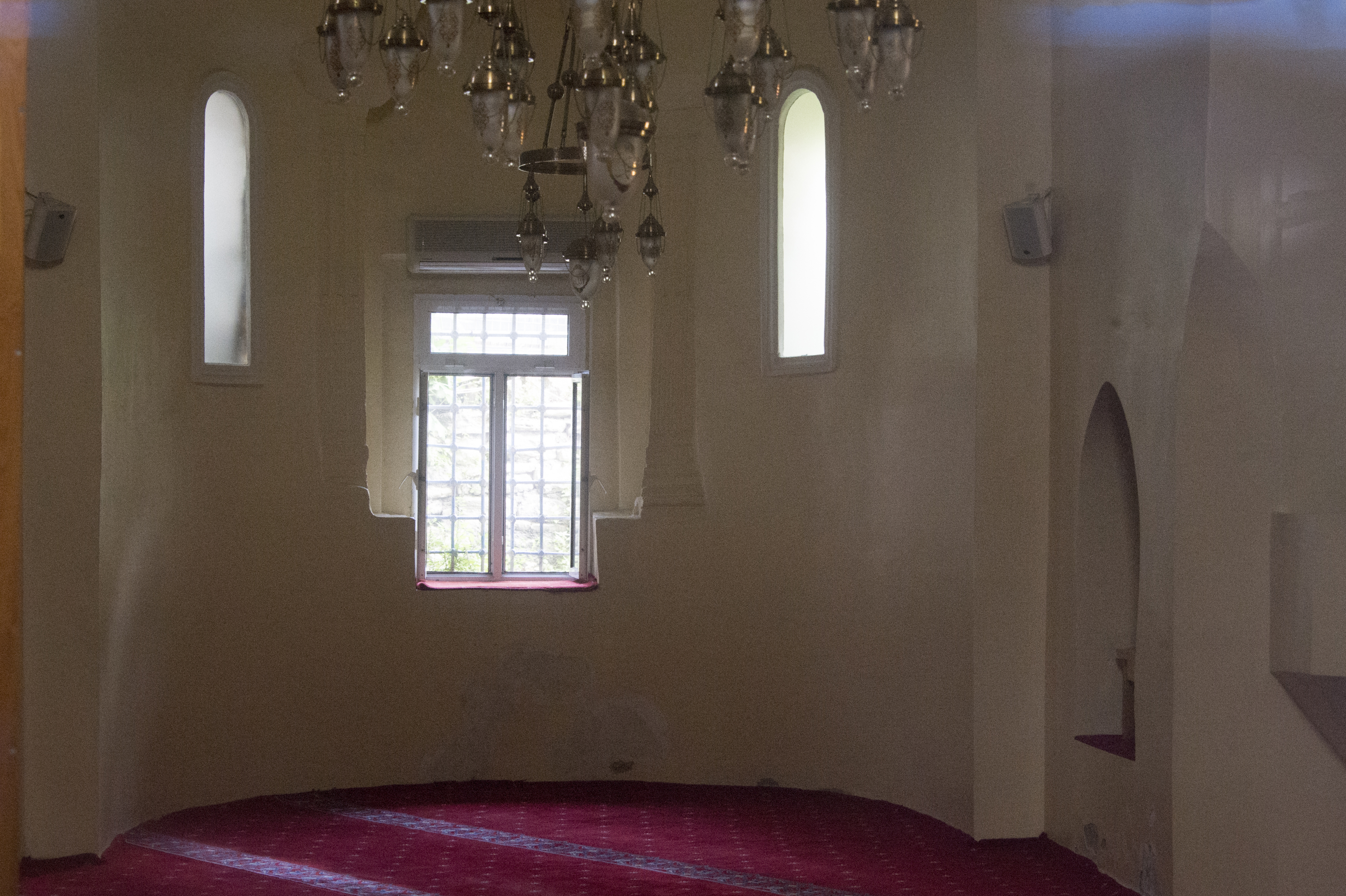
Sancaktar Hayrettin Mosque interior
