= Trabea =

Ancient Roman clothing

Trabea (pl.: trabeae) is the name of various pieces of Roman clothing. A distinct feature of all trabeae was their color – usually red or purple. They were formed like a toga and possibly in some cases like a mantle and worn by more distinguished members of Roman society.

A garment known as the trabea triumphalis was commonly worn by consuls in late antiquity. When Emperor Justinian I abolished the office of consul as a separate entity from the Emperor himself, the trabea triumphalis developed into the loros, which was the worn only by the imperial family and senior administrative officials. Although Emperor Leo VI abolished the ancient title of consul altogether, the loros persisted until the end of the empire as the formal, ceremonial dress of the emperors.

== See also ==
- Clothing in ancient Rome
