= Nektarios Dovas =

Greek Orthodox bishop

His Eminence Nektarios
- Metropolitan of Corfu, Paxoi and the Diapontian Islands
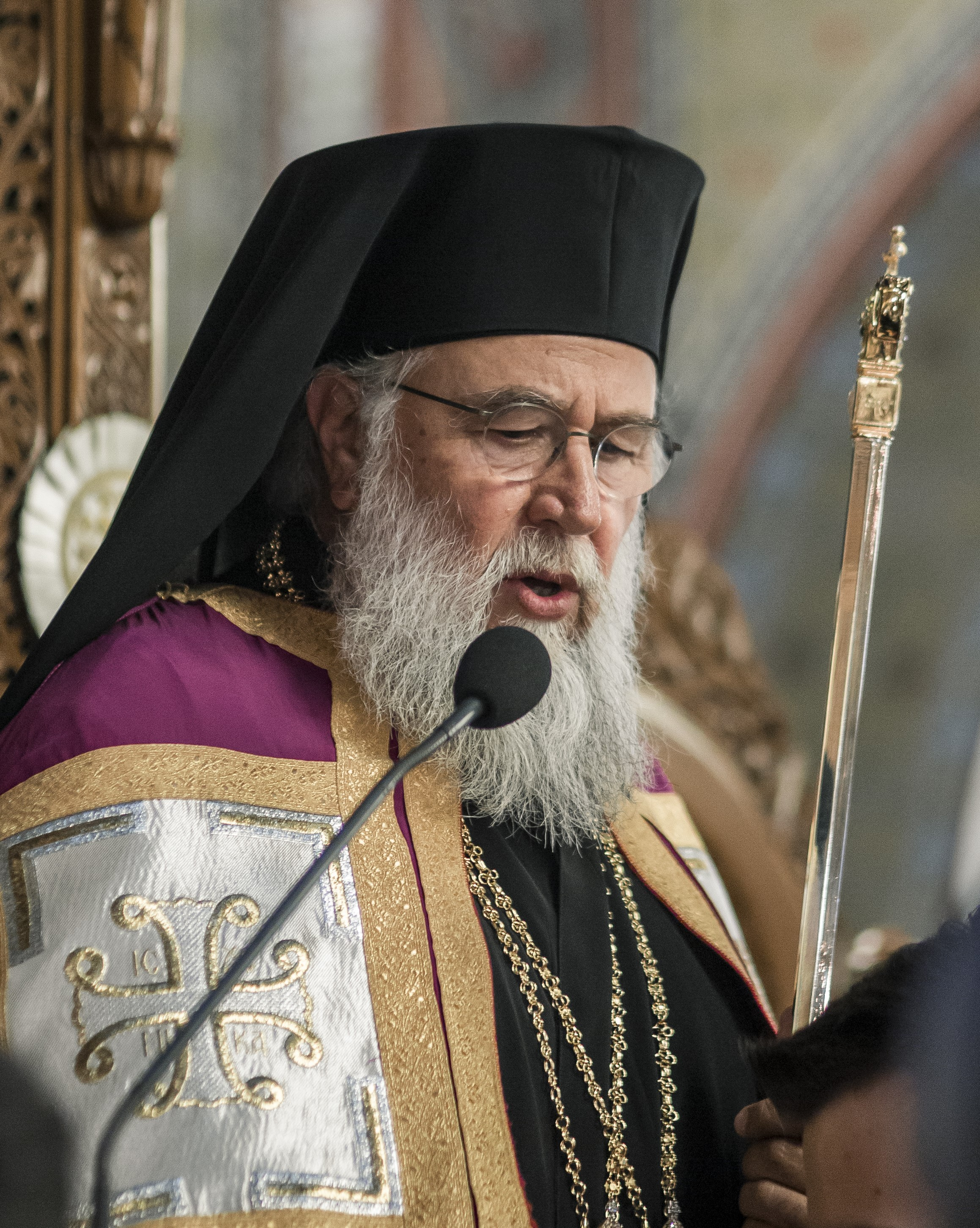
- Metropolitan Nektarios, 2016
- Native name: Μητροπολίτης Νεκτάριος (Ντόβας)
- Church: Church of Greece
- Metropolis: Metropolis of Corfu, Paxoi and the Diapontian Islands
- Elected: 11 October 2002
- Predecessor: Timotheos (Trivizas)

Orders
- Ordination: 1975 (Deacon), 1979 (Priest) by Metropolitan Christodoulos of Demetrias
- Consecration: 13 October 2002 by Archbishop Christodoulos of Athens

Personal details
- Born: Dimitrios Dovas; 20 January 1953 (age 73) Volos, Greece
- Denomination: Eastern Orthodox

Nektarios Dovas (Greek: Νεκτάριος Ντόβας; secular name Dimitrios Dovas; born 20 January 1953) is a Metropolitan bishop of the Church of Greece. He has served as Metropolitan of Corfu, Paxoi and the Diapontian Islands since 2002.

== Early life and education ==
Dimitrios Dovas was born on 20 January 1953, in the city of Volos, Greece. He undertook theological studies at the Rizarios Ecclesiastical School of Athens, graduating in 1973. Subsequently, in the same year, he was tonsured a monk at the Holy Monastery of Ano Xenia in Magnesia, taking the name Nektarios. He was ordained a Deacon by Metropolitan Christodoulos of Demetrias (later Archbishop of Athens) on 1 January 1975. In this role, he continued theological education, graduating from the Theological School of the University of Athens in 1979. This led to his ordination to the Priesthood by Metropolitan Christodoulos on 4 March 1979, receiving the title of Archimandrite on the same day.

=== Administrative and spiritual ministry ===
Archimandrite Nektarios carried out his pastoral and philanthropic ministry as Rector of the Holy Church of Saints Constantine and Helen in Volos. In addition to his priestly roles, Nektarios served as Director of the Office of Metropolitan Christodoulos of Demetrias from 1975 to 1986. In 1986, Nektarios advanced in his ecclesiastical career, elected as Hegumen of the Ano Xenia Monastery, where he was tonsured as a monastic.

== Episcopal ministry ==
=== Election and ordination ===
In 2002, following the repose of Metropolitan Timotheos of Corfu from cardiac arrest, the Holy Synod of the Orthodox Church of Greece convened to elect a successor. On 11 October 2002, Archimandrite Nektarios was elected with 51 votes in his favour, against 16 votes for Archimandrite Timotheos Anthis (now Metropolitan of Thessaliotis) and Fanariofersala) and an additional 8 votes for Archimandrite Ignatios Riganas.

Nektarios was ordained to the Episcopate in a Hierarchical Divine Liturgy at the Metropolitan Cathedral of Athens two days after his election, officiated by Archbishop Christodoulos of Athens. A month later, on 23 November 2002, he was formally enthroned as Metropolitan of Corfu, Paxoi and the Diapontian Islands at the Metropolitan Cathedral of Panagia Spilaiotissa.

=== Governance ===
As Metropolitan of Corfu, Metropolitan Nektarios' spiritual administration centers around the preservation of the relics of Saint Spyridon the Wonderworker. He is regularly involved in the organisation of international pilgrimages with the relics of the saint, with striking occurrences including a visit to the Russian Orthodox Church in August 2026, and previous pilgrimage tours to the United States of America (in 2017), Cyprus, Romania, Serbia, and around Greece.

=== Philanthropic initiatives ===
Metropolitan Nektarios has maintained a strong, active voice in social issues and called for philanthropic action throughout society. In 2019, he made a call for social solidarity among Orthodox Christians throughout Greece and the world, stressing that "nothing is immune to the spiritual and moral degradation of society." This came as the Holy Synod of the Church of Greece debated the issue of recognising the autocephaly of the Orthodox Church of Ukraine, urging hierarchs to postpone their decision to prevent further geopolitical turmoil.

Through the administration of the Metropolis of Corfu, Metropolitan Nektarios has organised and instituted several charitable activities, including food distribution, blood banks, student housing, chronic illness foundations and educational initiatives and services. In June 2026, following scandalous discussion regarding the raise of state salaries for hierarchs of the Church of Greece, Metropolitan Nektarios wrote a letter proposing to his fellow hierarchs to forgo their salaries, emphasising that "the bishop does not exist in the Church to claim personal rewards, but to serve the people of God, to function, to teach, to comfort, to support, to unite, to bear together with his people the burden of life."

== Views ==
=== Relationship with Russian Orthodox Church ===
In 2018, the Russian Orthodox Church formally severed communion with the Ecumenical Patriarchate of Constantinople, following the latter's intention to grant autocephaly to the Orthodox Church of Ukraine (OCU), led by Epiphanius of Kyiv. The other autocephalous Orthodox Churches were encouraged by the Ecumenical Patriarchate to follow suit, leading to a decision by the Church of Greece to recognise the autocephaly of the OCU (resulting in a breakage of communion from Moscow).

However, despite this synodal declaration of recognition, Metropolitan Nektarios remains to occupy a unique position within the Church of Greece. Unlike other hierarchs, who near-immediately severed all interaction with the Moscow Patriarchate, Metropolitan Nektarios maintains that the Church of Greece never severed communion with the Russian Orthodox Church, leading a non-confrontational approach towards Patriarch Kirill of Moscow and the Patriarchate as a whole.

In August 2026, Metropolitan Nektarios led a pilgrimage delegation to Moscow, visiting the Cathedral of Christ the Saviour with a relic of St. Spyridon for the veneration of the Russian Orthodox faithful. During the visit, Patriarch Kirill presented Metropolitan Nektarios with the Order of St. Seraphim of Sarov, 2nd Class, granted in recognition of his contribution to strengthening strained ties between the Russian and Greek Orthodox Churches. Metropolitan Nektarios gratefully responded, comparing the Russian patriarch to the late primate of the Church of Greece, Archbishop Christodoulos, noting his ability to "rightly divide the word of truth." In exchange, he presented Patriarch Kirill with the highest honour of the Metropolis of Corfu, the Order of the Golden Cross with the Star of Saint Spyridon.

=== COVID-19 opinions ===
Particularly throughout COVID-19, Metropolitan Nektarios has been known to frequently clash with Greek government secular policies. During lockdowns, he publicly urged Orthodox Christians to bypass state restrictions to partake in Holy Communion, claiming that the present situation was a "rehearsal for a global dictatorship."

=== Same-sex marriage ===
Following the legalisation of same-sex marriage in Greece, Metropolitan of Corfu released a public statement condemning local politicians who approved the legislation, showing public outrage and condemning the politicians to excommunication and exclusion from the Church.
