= Constantine (son of Theophilos) =

Byzantine co-emperor in the 830s

- Emperor of the Romans
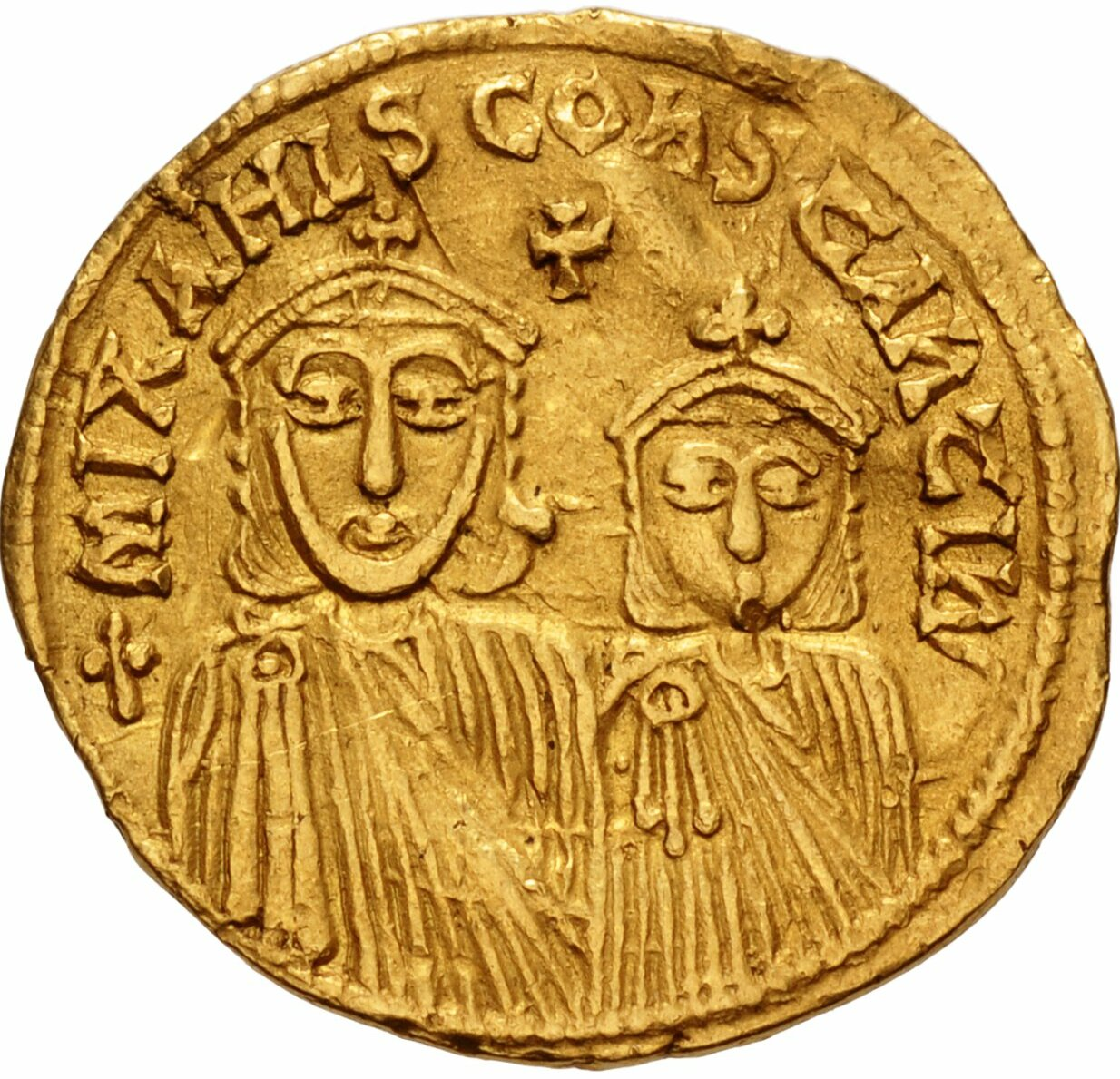
- Constantine (right) and his grandfather Michael II on the reverse of a solidus minted by Constantine's father Theophilos

Byzantine co-emperor
- Reign: 830s
- Predecessor: Theophilos
- Successor: Theophilos
- Born: 820s or 830s
- Died: before 836
- Burial: Church of the Holy Apostles
- Dynasty: Amorian dynasty
- Father: Theophilos
- Mother: Theodora

Constantine (Greek: Κωνσταντῖνος, romanized: Kōnstantīnos, 820s or 830s – before 836) was an infant prince of the Amorian dynasty who briefly reigned as co-emperor of the Byzantine Empire sometime in the 830s, alongside his father, Theophilos. Most information about Constantine's short life and titular reign is unclear, although it is known that he was born sometime in the 820s or 830s and was installed as co-emperor soon after his birth. He died sometime before 836, possibly after falling into a palace cistern.

== Life ==
Constantine was born to the Byzantine Emperor Theophilos and his wife, Empress Theodora. The coinage issued under Theophilos suggests that Constantine was their firstborn son, and he was perhaps their eldest child, although there remains a possibility that he was any one of their first four. He had five sisters: Thekla, Anna, Anastasia, Pulcheria, and Maria. Constantine and his family belonged to the Amorian dynasty, which had ruled the Byzantine Empire since the accession of Constantine's paternal grandfather Michael II to the imperial throne in 820. Unusually, Theophilos defied standard naming conventions, as his son was not named after Michael II; instead, Theophilos chose the name Constantine, which the Byzantinist Judith Herrin explains could be an homage to Constantine the Great or a hope that the prince would continue the iconoclastic religious policies of previous emperors named Constantine. (Note: Iconoclasm was a religious movement that objected to the usage of icons, the artistic representation of holy figures, in worship. Iconoclasm was publicly adopted in the Byzantine Empire in 726, which lasted until 787, when Emperor Constantine VI and Empress Irene denounced it at the Second Council of Nicaea. Iconoclasm was revived by Emperor Leo V in 815 and the prohibition of icons continued under Michael II and his son Theophilos. Theophilos banned the creation of icons and oppressed those who venerated them; his policies were later reversed by his widow, Theodora, in 843, ruling as regent for their son Michael III, in an event now known as the Triumph of Orthodoxy. Iconoclasm was anathematized in the late 9th century, and ceased to be a major point of contention.)

As Theophilos had succeeded Michael II on 2 October 829, Constantine was heir to his father's throne and was crowned co-emperor a short time after his birth. He appears as such on the coinage issued under his father, albeit addressed as despot (not a formal title, but an honorific interchangeable with basileus, i.e., emperor) on gold coins, but with no title at all on bronze ones. He died shortly afterwards, still in his infancy. The British historian Philip Grierson used the inscription on Constantine's coffin, which read λαρνάκιον (larnakion), meaning "little coffin", as evidence to support the claim that Constantine died young.

There is little clarity as to the dates of his birth, coronation and death. In the Prosopography of the Middle Byzantine Period, its authors, including the Byzantinist Ralph-Johannes Lilie, state that Constantine's birth date could possibly be during the 820s and that his death date was before 831. The historian Lynda Garland argues that Constantine was born in 834 and died when he was two years old, assuming that he was crowned immediately after his birth. Herrin also agrees with this birth date. In any case, only one emperor is mentioned for 831 in the De Ceremoniis, a 10th-century book describing Byzantine courtly protocol and history written by Constantine VII; Constantine is also missing on coins minted in 831/32 and 832/33; this could mean he was only raised to co-emperor in 833. The historian Warren Treadgold states that Constantine died around 835; he must have died by 836, since in that year Theophilos was recorded as being without a male heir (Constantine's younger brother Michael III would be born in 840), a situation Theophilos attempted to rectify by marrying his infant daughter Maria to general Alexios Mosele, who shortly before this (possibly as early as 831) had been promoted to caesar (heir to the throne).

According to the Theophanes Continuatus, a collection of writings likely penned in the 10th century, Constantine died by drowning in a cistern at the Palace of Blachernae after escaping the care of his nurse. Constantine's saddened father constructed gardens on the spot of his son's death, although the Prosopography of the Middle Byzantine Period points out that this story may actually refer to a son of another emperor, not Constantine. His parents buried him in a sarcophagus made of Thessalian marble in the Church of the Holy Apostles. In the De Ceremoniis, Constantine VII wrote that Constantine's coffin lay beside that of his sister Maria.

== Sources ==
- Foss, Clive (2005). "Emperors Named Constantine". Revue numismatique. 6 (161): 93–102. doi:10.3406/numi.2005.2594.
- Garland, Lynda (1999). Byzantine Empresses: Women and Power in Byzantium AD 527–1204. Routledge. ISBN 0-415-14688-7.
- Grierson, Philip (1973). Catalogue of the Byzantine Coins in the Dumbarton Oaks Collection and in the Whittemore Collection, 3: Leo III to Nicephorus III, 717-1081. Vol. III. Dumbarton Oaks Papers. pp. 406–452. ISBN 9780884020455.
- Herrin, Judith (2002) [2001]. Women in Purple: Rulers of Medieval Byzantium. London: Phoenix Press. ISBN 1-84212-529-X.
- Hollingsworth, Paul A. (1991). "Amorian or Phrygian Dynasty". In Kazhdan, Alexander (ed.). Oxford Dictionary of Byzantium. Oxford: Oxford University Press. p. 79. ISBN 978-0-19-504652-6.
- Hollingsworth, Paul A.; Cutler, Anthony (1991). "Iconoclasm". In Kazhdan, Alexander (ed.). Oxford Dictionary of Byzantium. Oxford: Oxford University Press. pp. 975–976. ISBN 978-0-19-504652-6.
- Lilie, Ralph-Johannes; Ludwig, Claudia; Pratsch, Thomas; Zielke, Beate (1998–2013). Prosopographie der mittelbyzantinischen Zeit (in German). Berlin and Boston: De Gruyter.
- Treadgold, Warren (1997). A History of the Byzantine State and Society. Stanford: Stanford University Press. ISBN 978-0-8047-2630-6.
- Treadgold, Warren (1975). "The Problem of the Marriage of the Emperor Theophilus". Greek, Roman, and Byzantine Studies. 16: 325–341.

Constantine (son of Theophilos) Amorian dynasty Born: c. 830s Died: before 836
Regnal titles
Preceded by Theophilos as sole emperor	Byzantine emperor 830s Served alongside: Theophilos	Succeeded by Theophilos as sole emperor
