= Theodora (wife of Theophilos) =

Byzantine empress (c. 815 – c. 867 CE)

Theodora II
- Augusta
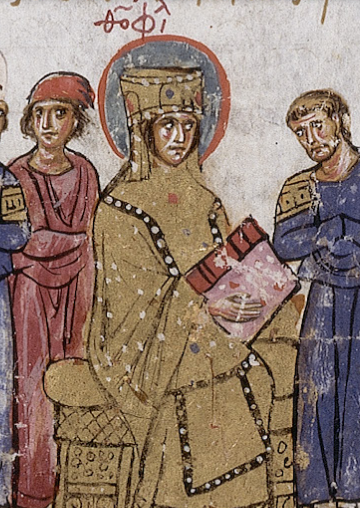
- Empress Theodora as depicted in the 12th century Madrid Skylitzes

Byzantine regent
- Regency: 20 January 842 – 15 March 856
- Monarchs: Michael III and Thekla

Byzantine empress consort
- Tenure: 5 June 830 – 20 January 842
- Coronation: 5 June 830
- Born: c. 815; Paphlagonia, Byzantine Empire
- Died: c. 867 (aged c. 52); Constantinople, Byzantine Empire
- Burial: Metropolitan Cathedral of Panagia Spilaiotissa (since 1480)
- Spouse: Theophilos (m. 830; died 842)
- Issue: Constantine; Thekla; Anna; Anastasia; Pulcheria; Maria; Michael III
- Dynasty: Amorian dynasty (through marriage)
- Father: Marinos
- Mother: Theoktiste Phlorina
- Religion: Chalcedonian Christianity

Theodora (Note: She is sometimes enumerated as Theodora II, with Theodora, the wife (and in certain aspects co-ruler) of Justinian I, being considered Theodora I. In this arrangement the later empress regnant Theodora Porphyrogenita is considered to be Theodora III.) (Greek: Θεοδώρα; c. 815 – c. 867), sometimes called Theodora the Armenian or Theodora the Blessed, was Byzantine empress as the wife of Byzantine emperor Theophilos from 830 to 842. Following Theophilos's death, the widowed Theodora acted as regent for the couple's young son, Michael III, until her son deposed her in 856.

In 830, Theodora married Theophilos, becoming Byzantine empress consort and giving birth to seven children. Theodora, as an iconophile, held contrasting beliefs from her iconoclast husband during a period of intense conflict over the veneration of religious images. Nevertheless, while on his deathbed in 842, Theophilos named Theodora as regent for their then-two-year-old son Michael III. Theophilos designated a selection of advisors to assist the empress regent, most notably the logothete and eunuch Theoktistos, who would become one of Theodora's closest confidantes.

Throughout her son's minority, Theodora proved an able regent over the empire. Though her rule saw the loss of most of Sicily and failure to retake Crete, she also oversaw several successful foreign policy measures that secured the empire against threats from the neighboring Bulgarian Empire and Abbasid Caliphate. She is perhaps best known for bringing an end to the second Byzantine Iconoclasm (814–843), an act for which she is recognized as a saint in the Eastern Orthodox Church.

As Michael III grew older, he came to fear and resent the authority his mother held over the empire and successfully had her deposed in 856, declaring himself sole emperor. Theodora continued to live in the imperial palace until 857 or 858, when she was expelled and confined to a convent in Gastria alongside some of her daughters. She may have been released from the convent around 863 and allowed to take some form of ceremonial role. She died some time after Michael III was murdered by his friend and co-emperor, Basil I.

== Background and early life ==
Theodora was born c. 815, in Ebissa, Paphlagonia. She was the daughter of the droungarios and tourmarches Marinos, who died at some point before 830, and Theoktiste Phlorina. Theodora had five siblings: brothers Bardas and Petronas and sisters Sophia, Maria and Irene. Irene might later have married the prominent general Theophobos.

Theodora's rural Paphlagonian family is generally believed to have been of Armenian descent, although no contemporary sources describe her as being Armenian. Though a link between Theodora's family and the Armenian noble clan of the Mamikonian has been suggested in the past, there are not enough sources to prove such a connection. In any event, Theodora's family associated with certain Armenian families in the capital. She was the niece of Manuel the Armenian, a prominent Byzantine general who in 819/820 briefly commanded all five of the empire's Asian provinces. It is possible that the family was involved in trade on the Black Sea, as they owned ships used for commerce. It is not clear whether Theodora's family, with the exception of Manuel, were well connected or well established prior to her becoming empress.

== Empress consort ==
=== Selection and marriage ===
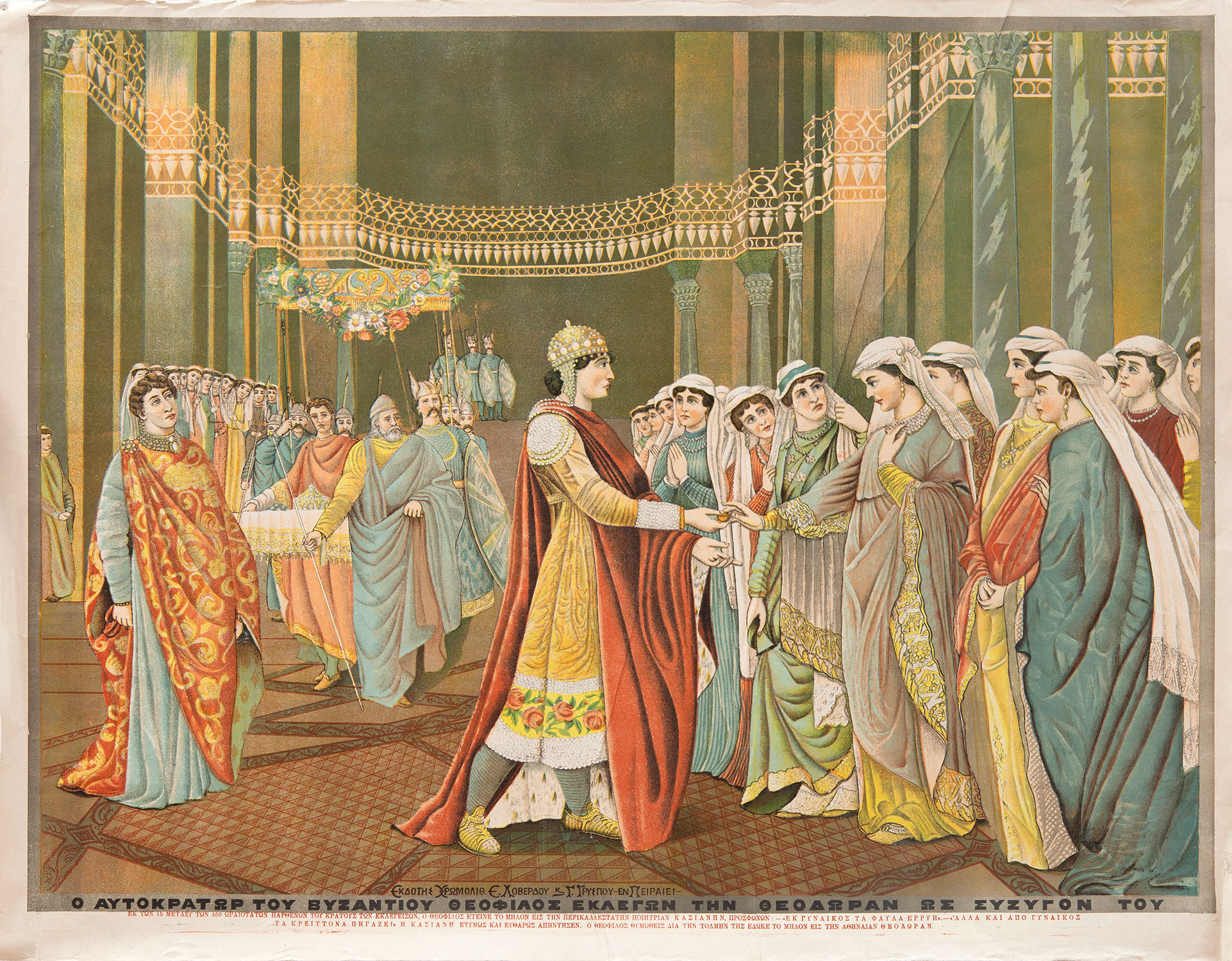
Early 20th-century depiction of Emperor Theophilos at his step-mother Euphrosyne's bride-show, choosing Theodora to become his wife

In 830, Euphrosyne, the step-mother of Emperor Theophilos, held a bride-show for the young emperor, handpicking a selection of young women after having sent out officials to gather the most beautiful and well-born women of the provinces. Theophilos was born in 812/813 and had been crowned co-emperor by his father Michael II in 821, becoming the senior emperor in 829 after his father's death. He was an iconoclast (against the veneration of icons), given that the empire had returned to Iconoclasm under his father's predecessor, Leo V.

Theophilos was eager for a bride and made the affair into a spectacle, assembling the women in a newly erected and splendid hall in the imperial palace. In the end, Theophilos chose Theodora, and indicated his choice by giving her a golden apple. According to the later chronicler Symeon Logothete, Theophilos had at first been struck by the beauty of another girl, Kassia (later a prominent poet and composer), and cynically said to her that "through a woman, evils came to man" (referring to Eve). This comment, deemed by Judith Herrin to have been an "unfortunate way to engage a future wife's affections", prompted Kassia to reply "through a woman, better things began" (referring to the Virgin Mary). Taken aback by Kassia's bold retort, Theophilos passed her by and gave the apple to Theodora. According to Warren Treadgold, Theodora was "beautiful, (Note: A wide array of contemporary sources, both Byzantine and foreign, describe Theodora as exceptionally beautiful. The contemporary poet Al-Ghazal, sent as an emissary from the Emirate of Córdoba in 840, wrote that he was unable to take his eyes off of her while she was in the same room, despite Theophilos being astonished at his rudeness, and that "she had captivated him with her black eyes".) sensible and adaptable, and suited him well; but Theophilus seems to initially not have realized that his bride, like Euphrosyne, was an iconophile". Theodora was crowned empress in the Church of St Stephen in Daphne on 5 June 830 and the couple were then married in the Hagia Sophia.

=== Activities as empress consort ===
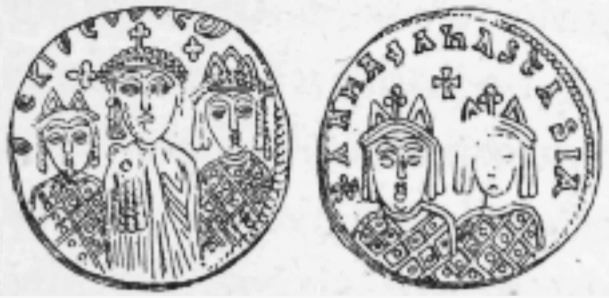
An unusual coin minted under Theophilos: the emperor is depicted on the obverse, flanked by Theodora (right) and their daughter Thekla (left). The reverse depicts the younger daughters Anna (left) and Anastasia (right).

After her coronation, Theodora donated 15 pounds (7 kg) of gold each to the patriarch of Constantinople and the clergy, and 50 pounds (23 kg) to the Byzantine Senate. Much of Theodora's time as empress consort was spent giving birth to and caring for her children. Theophilos and Theodora had seven children: the sons Constantine and Michael (the future emperor Michael III) and the daughters Thekla, Anna, Anastasia, Pulcheria and Maria. Constantine, briefly co-emperor, drowned in a palace cistern at the age of two. Unlike many emperors, Theophilos took great pride in his daughters. Thekla, Anna and Anastasia were the eldest children, and were all proclaimed Augustae in the late 830s and commemorated on a highly unusual issue of coins, depicting Theophilos, Theodora and Thekla on the obverse (forward facing side) and Anna and Anastasia on the reverse. Constantine was the fourth eldest, followed by Pulcheria and Maria. Michael was the couple's youngest child.

Throughout Theophilos's reign, Theodora apparently continued to secretly venerate icons despite her husband's disapproval. It is not clear to which extent she practiced these beliefs, or to what extent Theophilos was aware of them. For the most part it would have been possible for Theodora to keep the icon veneration secret given the privacy of the female quarters of the imperial palace. If he was aware, it is also not clear to what extent the differing religious convictions divided them on a personal level. At one point she succeeded in convincing her husband to release the imprisoned iconophile painter Lazarus Zographos.

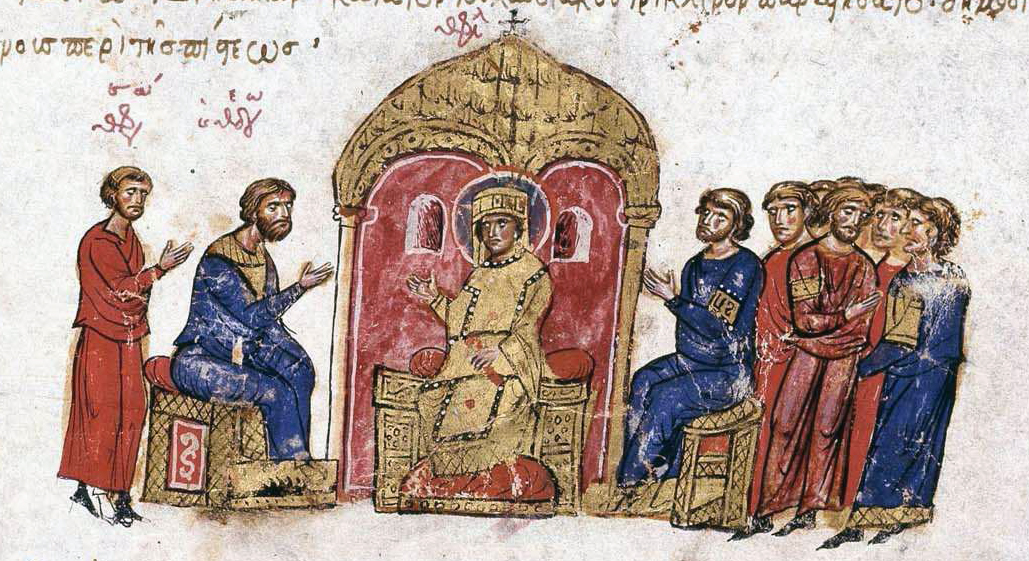
Empress Theodora discussing icons with her court.

Relations between the emperor and empress were not always good. In 839, Theophilos was discovered to have begun an affair with one of Theodora's attendants, which the empress took badly and made public. Theophilos broke off the affair, apologized to his wife, and as part of his apologies constructed a new palace, the Karianos, for their daughters. According to a possibly invented account, the couple also had a falling out after Theophilos spotted a fine merchant ship in the harbor, asked who it belonged to, and was informed that it belonged to his wife. Deeming merchant activities to be incompatible with imperial life, Theophilos exclaimed "What! Has my wife made me, an emperor, into a merchant?" and immediately had the ship and its cargo burnt.

Theodora's icon veneration sometimes led to conflict with her husband. She often sent their daughters to the monastery where Euphrosyne had retired to after 830. There, unbeknownst to Theophilos, the daughters were taught to venerate icons. Though the older daughters were smart and kept quiet of this, the younger daughter Pulcheria, about two years old, told her father in the middle of 839 of the "beautiful dolls" kept in a box in the monastery and how they would pull them to their faces and kiss them. Furious, Theophilos forbade his daughters from seeing Euphrosyne again and might also have forced Euphrosyne to leave the monastery. In any event, Theodora's and Euphrosyne's secret iconophile teachings had already been successful; none of Theophilos's and Theodora's children grew up to become iconoclasts.

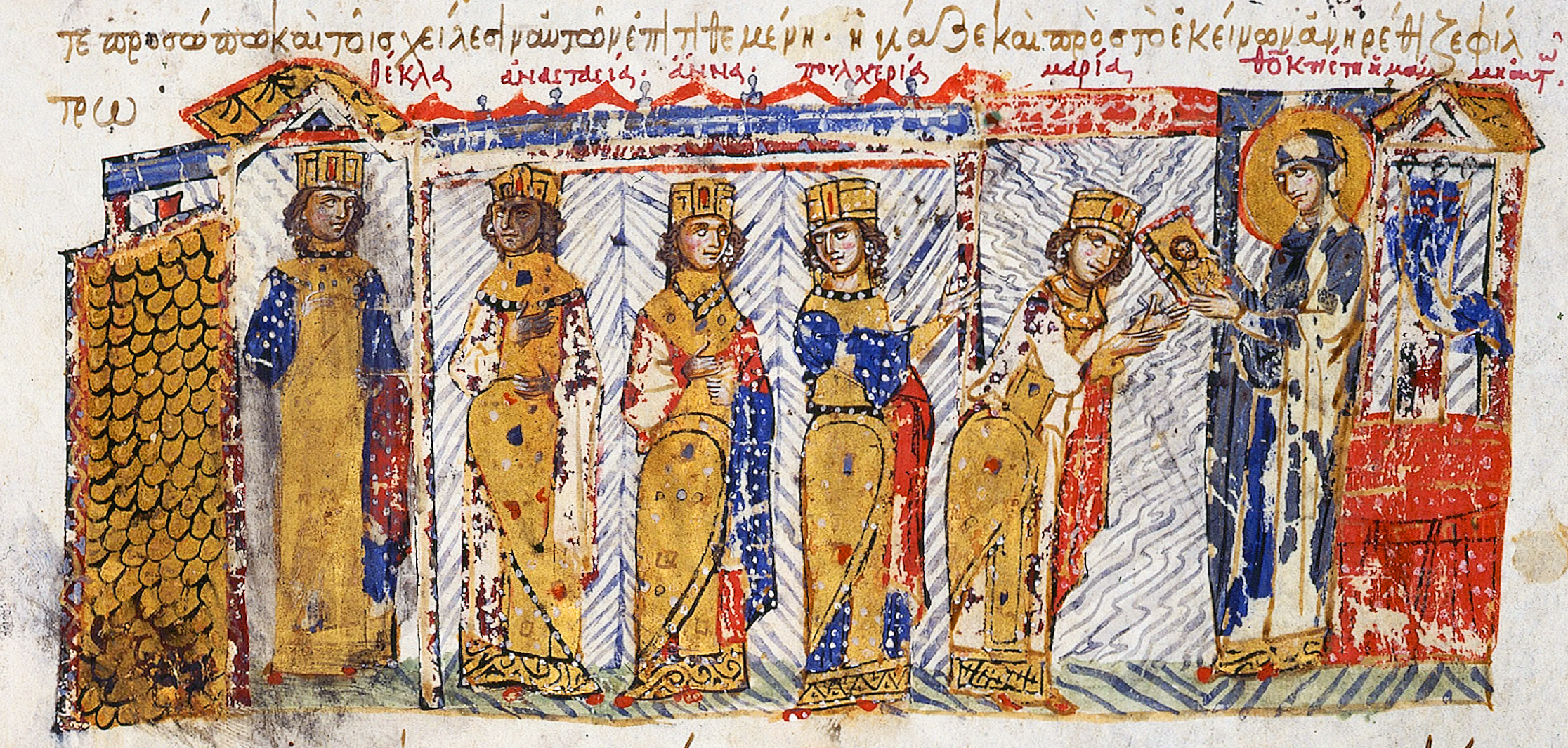
Theodora's daughters being instructed in venerating icons by their grandmother Theoktiste, (Note: It is unclear why Theodora's mother Theoktiste, and not Theophilos's step-mother Euphrosyne, who actually instructed the children, is depicted.) from the Madrid Skylitzes

Theodora celebrated various public ceremonies together with her husband. Though she had barely witnessed such ceremonies before becoming empress, there is no evidence that she ever erred in her actions, perhaps she was helped by Euphrosyne. Theodora also took part in celebrations of her husband's military achievements, appearing together with Theophilos at triumphs in 831 and 837, and hosting a special reception for the emperor and his generals at Hieria after his first military victory. After about twelve years on the throne, Theophilos died of dysentery on 20 January 842, probably younger than 30. On his deathbed, Theophilos had delivered an eloquent speech to his courtiers and officials, imploring them to defend the rights of his wife and their two-year-old son Michael III.

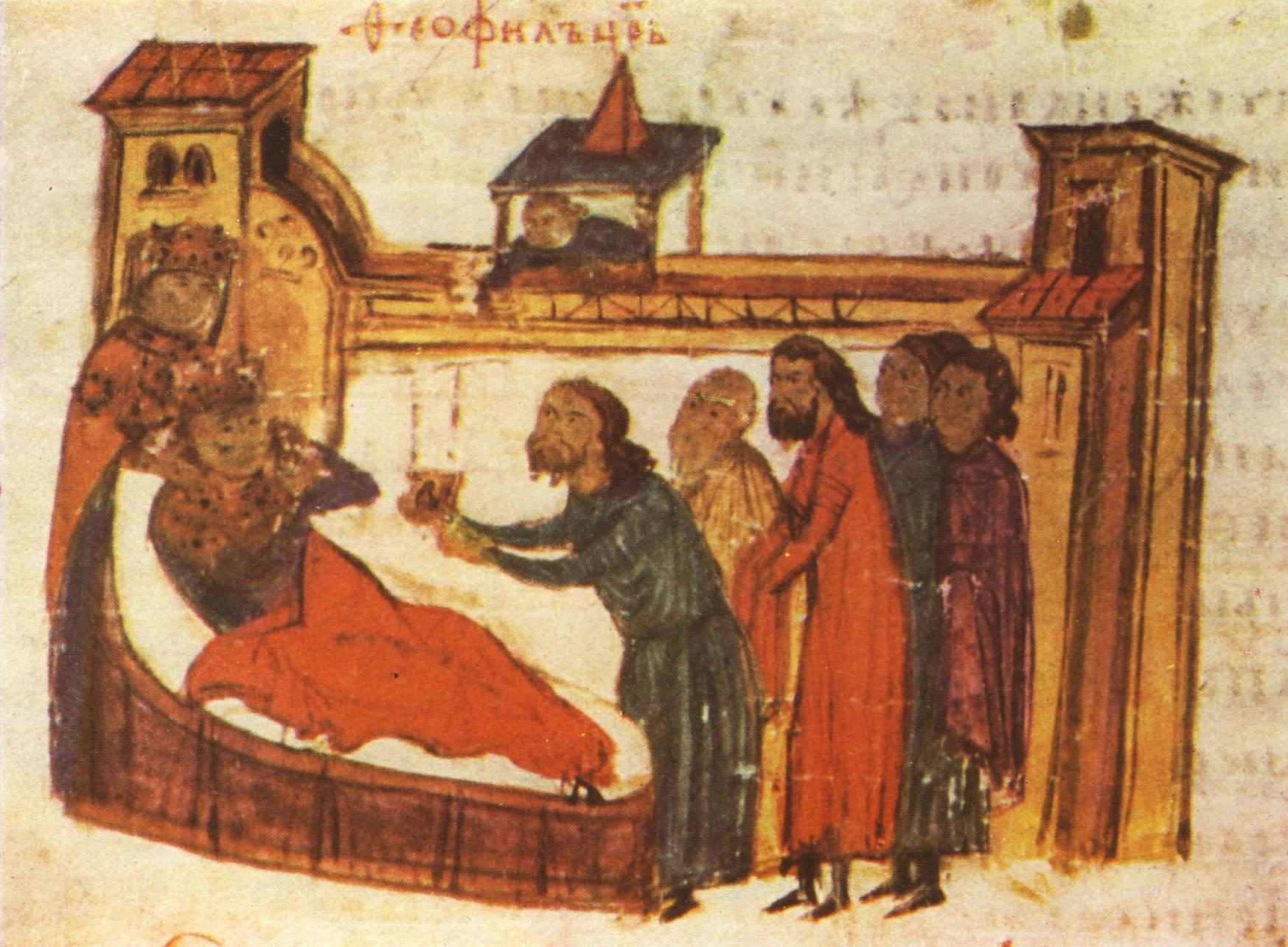
Theophilos kissing an icon before his impending death. Scene from the 14th century Manasses Chronicle.

== Regency ==
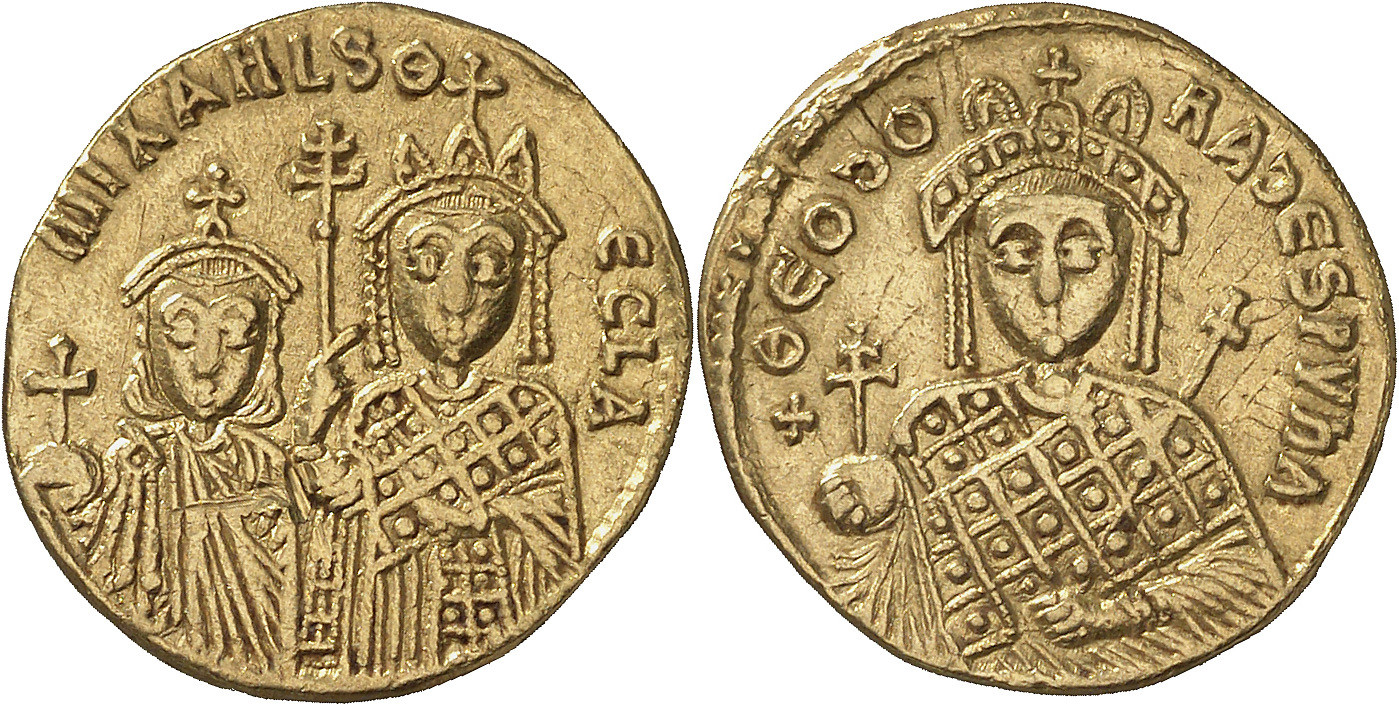
Coin minted during the first year of Theodora's rule. Theodora is depicted alone on the obverse and her daughter Thekla is depicted more prominently on the reverse than her son Michael III.

Just as had happened after the death of emperor Leo IV in 780, Theophilos's death in 842 meant that an iconoclast emperor was succeeded by his iconophile wife and their underage son. Unlike Leo IV's wife Irene, who later ended up deposing her son Constantine VI and ruling as empress in her own right, Theodora was not as ruthless and did not need to use as drastic methods to retain power. Though she was only in her late twenties, she had several able and loyal advisors and was a capable leader who inspired loyalty. Theodora never remarried, which allowed her to maintain her own independence and authority.

Among Theodora's most prominent advisors and supporters were her brothers Bardas and Petronas, her close relative Sergios Niketiates, as well as the logothete and eunuch Theoktistos. Most of her advisors were, like her, iconophiles, though some (including Theoktistos) had been iconoclasts up until recently. Theoktistos and possibly Bardas had been appointed to assist Theodora by Theophilos shortly before his death. Theophilos also appointed Manuel, Theodora's uncle, to assist her, but he might already have been dead by this point. Theophilos may have felt it important to appoint such experienced officials to assist Theodora due to the previous reign of Irene. There is no evidence to suggest that he did so because of Theodora's religious convictions. Shortly after becoming senior ruler, Theodora was criticized by an ascetic holy man by the name of Symeon, to whom she is said to have responded "Since you have reached this conclusion, depart from me. For as I received and learned from my spouse and husband, I will rule with a firm hand. You will see."

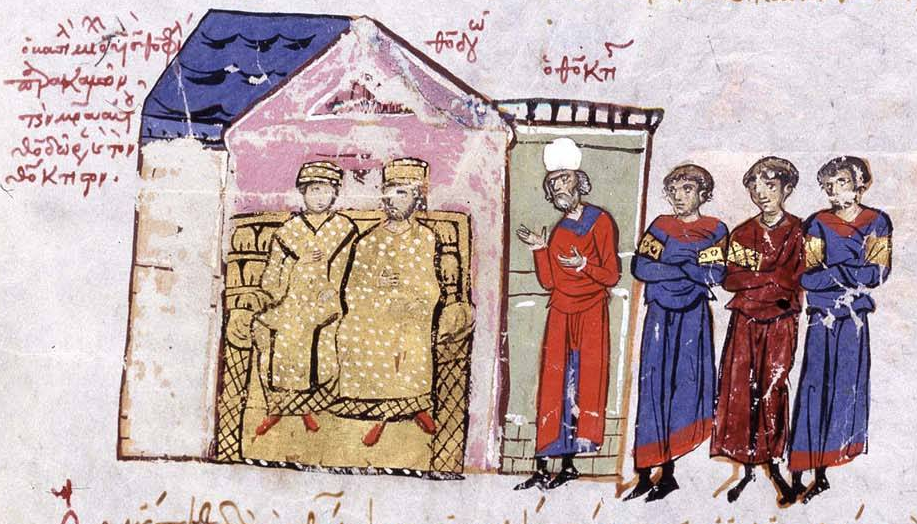
Michael III and Theodora with a selection of courtiers, including Theoktistos (depicted with a white cap), from the Madrid Skylitzes

The extent of Theodora's power is somewhat debated in modern scholarship. The Oxford Dictionary of Byzantium (1991) states that Theoktistos held effective power throughout Theodora's rule. Per J. B. Bury in A History of the Eastern Roman Empire (1912), Theodora's position was very similar to that of Irene during Constantine VI's regency and the imperial government was exercised jointly by both Theodora and the underage Michael III, with actual imperial authority "devolved upon the mother provisionally". According to Lynda Garland, it is difficult to determine whether Theodora or Theoktistos was primarily responsible for running the empire during Michael's minority, but that one or both should be considered "remarkably successful in government". Regardless of whether he was the effective power behind the throne, or simply an advisor, it is clear that Theoktistos, a senior government official with a long and loyal history of service, contributed to and influenced imperial policy during Theodora's rule. Theodora is recorded as handling the matters of state, appointing ministers and officials and handling diplomacy with foreign powers, sending ambassadors to Bulgaria, the Abbasid Caliphate and the Papacy. Coins issued in the first year of Theodora's rule show, significantly, Theodora (not Michael III) alone on the obverse and omit the other regents. Michael III and Thekla, the eldest daughter, are depicted on the reverse. Theodora is the only one given a title on these coins (she is titled Theodora despoina). These coins served to establish Theodora's own authority as ruler, and associate the young heirs. The coins also associate her eldest daughter (who is depicted more prominently than Michael) with imperial power, and show that Thekla was officially associated with the regime. An imperial seal, also from the early years of her rule, gives not only Michael but also Theodora and Thekla the title "Emperors of the Romans". Later coins tend to depict the image of Christ Pantocrator on one side and Theodora together with Michael on the other.

=== Restoration of icon veneration ===
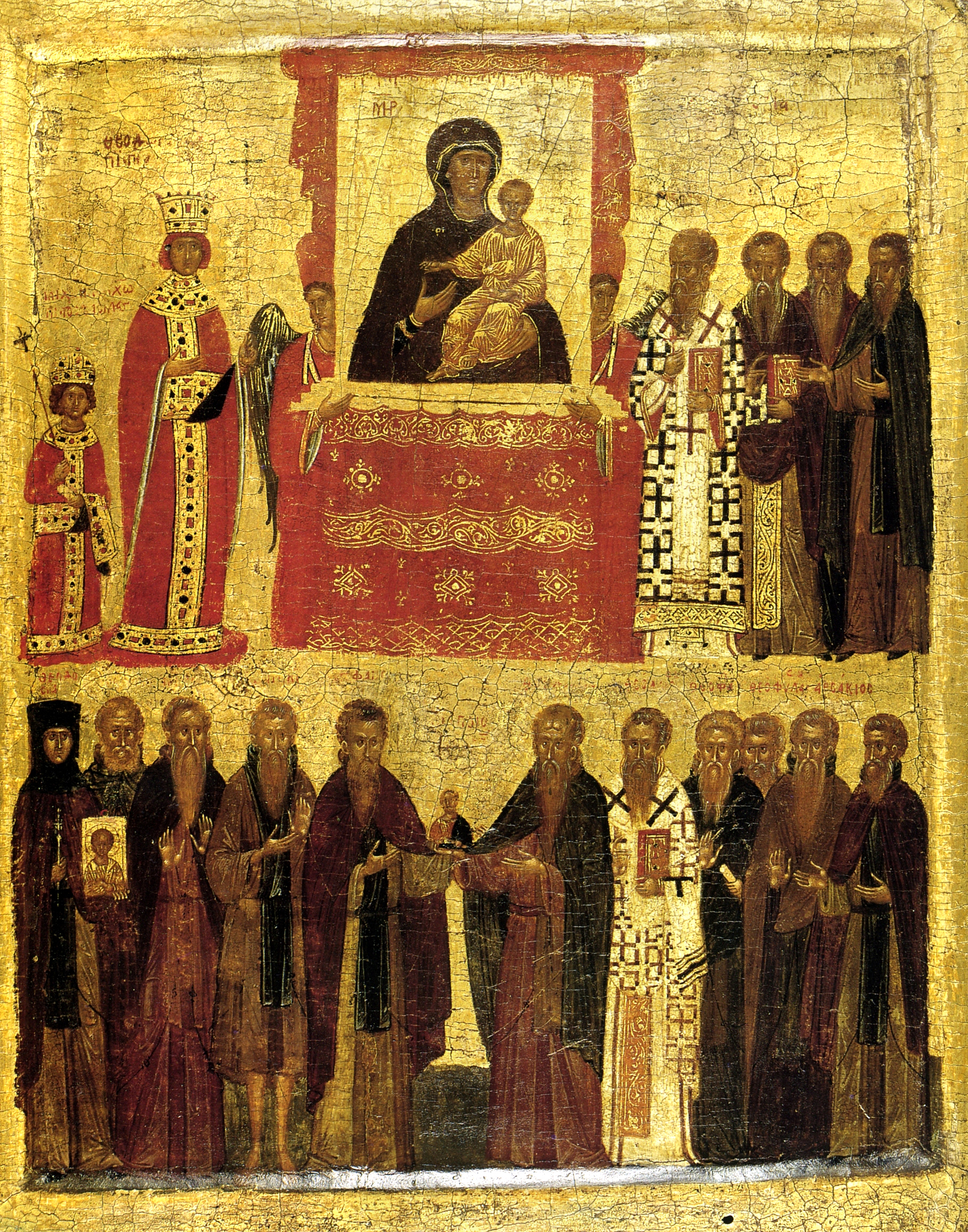
Late-14th- or early-15th-century icon of the "Triumph of Orthodoxy" under Theodora over iconoclasm. Theodora and Michael III are depicted in the top-left and Patriarch Methodios I is depicted in the top-right.

As she had considerable support, Theodora restored the veneration of icons in March 843 at the Council of Constantinople, (Note: The decision to restore the icons is likely to have been Theodora's own idea and it demonstrates her authority as ruler and decision-maker. A figure like Theoktistos, who up until recently had been an iconoclast, is unlikely to have taken the initiative for such an action.) just fourteen months after Theophilos's death, ending the second Byzantine Iconoclasm (814–843). In order to counteract opposition and save the legacy of her husband, Theodora claimed that Theophilos had repented of Iconoclasm on his deathbed. This story also ensured that Theophilos's iconoclasm would not adversely affect Michael's reign in the future. Though religious policy would normally have been decided in conjunction with religious officials, nearly all bishops of the empire had been forced to profess Iconoclasm. As such, Theodora instead assembled a group of officials, courtiers and clerics. The most prominent members of the assembly were Theodora herself, Theoktistos, Niketiates and Theodora's two brothers; more akin to a family affair than a large council. The group met at Theoktistos's house, where they condemned Iconoclasm through accepting the Second Council of Nicaea (which in 787 had decided against Iconoclasm).

The iconoclast Patriarch of Constantinople, John VII, was deposed and replaced with the iconophile Methodios I. The entire process was conducted in relative peace, though John at first refused to leave the patriarch's residence and showed wounds on his stomach that he claimed had been inflicted by imperial guards, though they were more likely self-inflicted. John also produced issues while in exile in a monastery by the Bosporus, ordering a servant there to poke out the eyes of an icon, which prompted Theodora to order him to whipped 200 times (though she had at first wanted to blind him). Soon after becoming patriarch, Methodios had nearly every bishop in the empire deposed due to them having gone against the Second Council of Nicaea. On 11 March 843, the restoration of the icons was celebrated in a grand procession in the Hagia Sophia. The day of Theodora's assembly and restoration of the icons has been celebrated ever since as the Feast of Orthodoxy.

One symbolic action taken to mark the restoration of the icons was the desecration of the tomb of emperor Constantine V (r. 741–775), a champion of iconoclasm. His remains were removed from his tomb in the Church of the Holy Apostles and burned, with the ashes scattered so that no site would ever be associated with his burial. His tomb in the Church of the Holy Apostles was replaced with the tomb of Empress Irene, with her remains being transferred from her previous resting place on the island of Prinkipos, finally reuniting her remains with those of her husband and placing her alongside the other rulers of the empire. It is possible that Theodora admired Irene on account of her being a previous female ruler as well as a previous restorer of the icons. Irene's grave would in later years often be commemorated as the resting place of an iconophile hero.

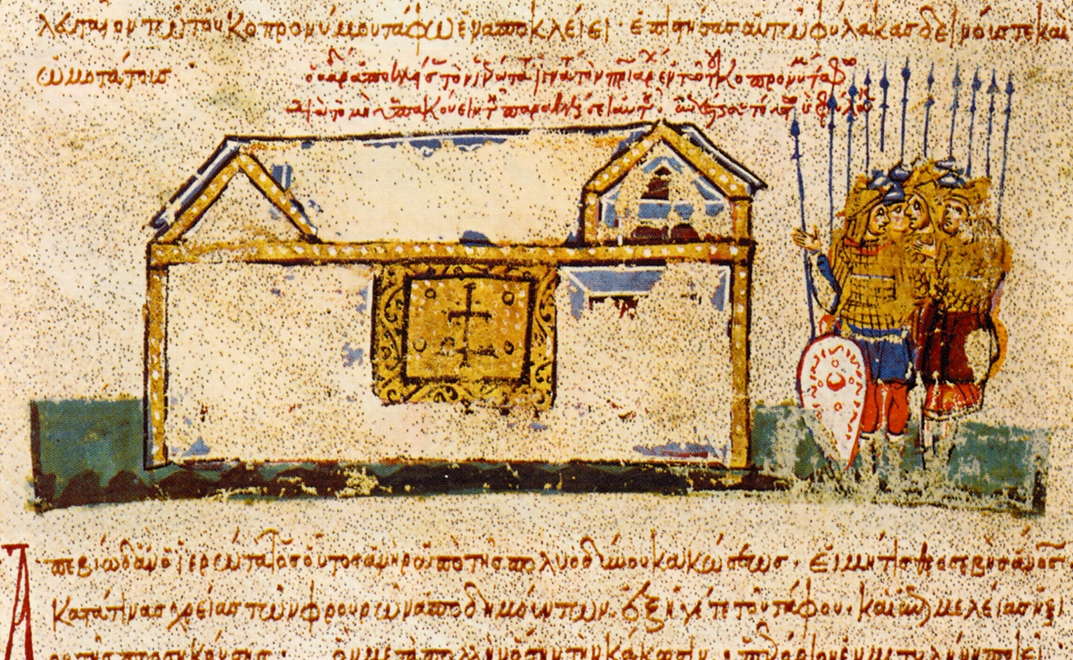
Soldiers guarding the tomb of Constantine V.

Though ordinary iconoclasm swiftly disappeared, a larger religious threat were the Paulician heretics, concentrated in eastern Anatolia. The Paulicians were dualists and also iconoclasts (as they rejected the entire material world). Shortly after restoring the icons, Theodora ordered the army to either forcefully convert, or execute, the Paulicians of the empire. Though some converted, thousands were killed and many escaped across the imperial border and were settled by Umar al-Aqta, emir of Melitene, in the empty border lands between the Abbasid Caliphate and the empire under his protection.

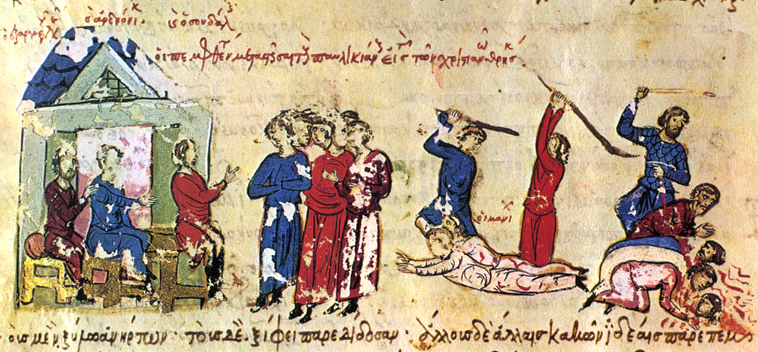
The Paulicians are massacred on the orders of Theodora.

=== Foreign policy ===
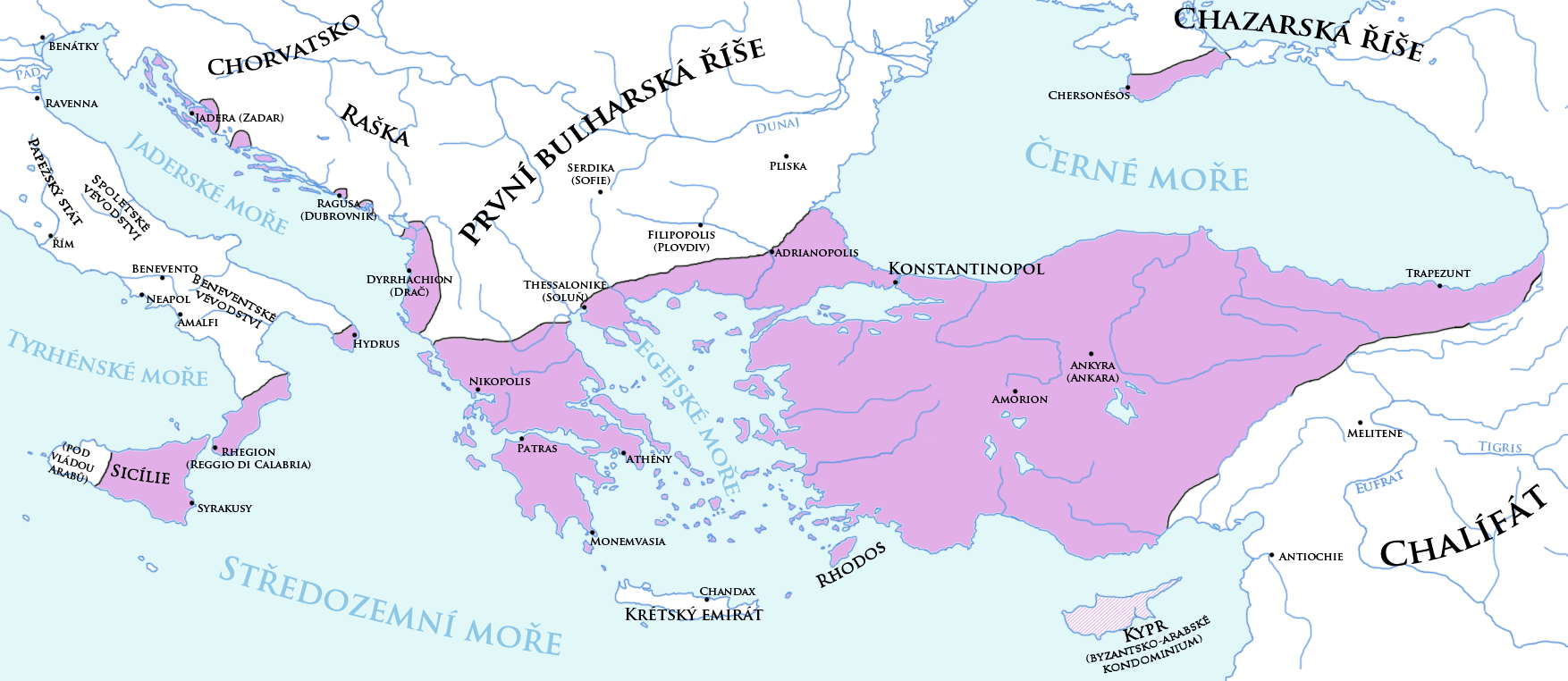
Map of the Byzantine Empire in 842, at the start of Theodora's rule

In order to demonstrate that Orthodoxy, just as well as Iconoclasm, could win victories for the empire, Theodora later in 853 organized an expedition to retake the island of Crete, lost some decades prior to Arab conquerors. Headed by Niketiates and Theoktistos, the expedition began as a considerable success, with the invasion force successfully landing, besieging the Arab fortresses, and setting up a Theme of Crete. However, Theoktistos became concerned when he heard rumors that Theodora intended to name a new emperor, possibly her brother Bardas, and abandoned the campaign to return to Constantinople. Though these rumors were false, and Theodora very much intended to hold onto power herself, Theoktistos was unable to return to Crete since news arrived of an invasion of Asia Minor by Umar al-Aqta of Malatya. Theoktistos was sent at the head of an army to confront him, but the resulting Battle of Mauropotamos ended in a Byzantine defeat. In 854, the Arabs on Crete counterattacked and destroyed the Byzantine invasion force and killed Niketiates. The Byzantines had lost at Mauropotamos partly due to desertions to the Arabs, which Theoktistos blamed upon Bardas, and convinced Theodora to expel her brother from the court. Perhaps worried that Bardas harbored certain ambitions of his own, Theodora did not put up much resistance to the idea of exiling him. Despite his failures, Theoktistos suffered no loss in prestige himself and remained influential at the imperial court. There was no major use of the military setbacks as propaganda by iconoclasts, and the veneration of icons endured mostly unchallenged.

Save for some minor attacks and raids in the east, and larger engagements in Sicily, the empire was mostly safe from further Arab threats throughout Theodora's rule and the empire as a whole enjoyed an extended period of relative peace. In 846, Khan Presian of Bulgaria raided Macedonia and Thrace due to the expiration of a thirty-year treaty with the empire, but he was repulsed and forced to sign a new treaty. Theodora organized an expedition in 848 to attempt to retake Sicily, but it was defeated by the Arab invaders. In the summers of 851 to 854, Ali ibn Yahya al-Armani, emir of Tarsus, raided imperial territory, perhaps viewing the empire being governed by a young widow and her child as a sign of weakness. Though Ali's raids did little damage, Theodora decided to retaliate and sent raiding parties to raid the coastline of Egypt in 853 and 854. In 853, the Byzantine raiders burnt down the Egyptian city of Damietta and in 855, a Byzantine army invaded Ali's emirate and sacked the city of Anazarbus, taking 20,000 prisoners. On Theoktistos's orders, some of the prisoners who refused to convert to Christianity were executed. According to later chroniclers, these successes, particularly the sack of Anazarbus, impressed even the Arabs.

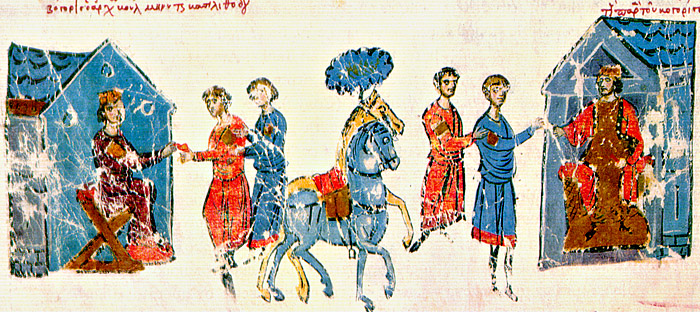
Depiction of ambassadors being sent between Theodora and Boris I of Bulgaria in the Madrid Skylitzes

Shortly after the sack of Anazarbus, Boris I of Bulgaria began making threats towards the empire as the Bulgarian treaty was once more about to expire, however, he was convinced to renew it without the need for military action. Later chronicles, probably fancifully, claimed that Theodora had threatened Boris that she would lead the Byzantine army in person against him if he invaded the empire, and that she had stated that Boris achieving victory over a female head of state would hardly be considered a great achievement.

By the end of Theodora's rule, the empire had gained the upper hand over both Bulgaria and the Abbasid Caliphate. At some point the Slavic tribes that had settled in the Peloponnese had also successfully been forced to pay tribute. Despite continuing a policy of high wages for the soldiers, instituted by Theophilos, Theodora maintained a small surplus in the imperial budget and even modestly increased the imperial gold reserves.

=== Fall from power ===
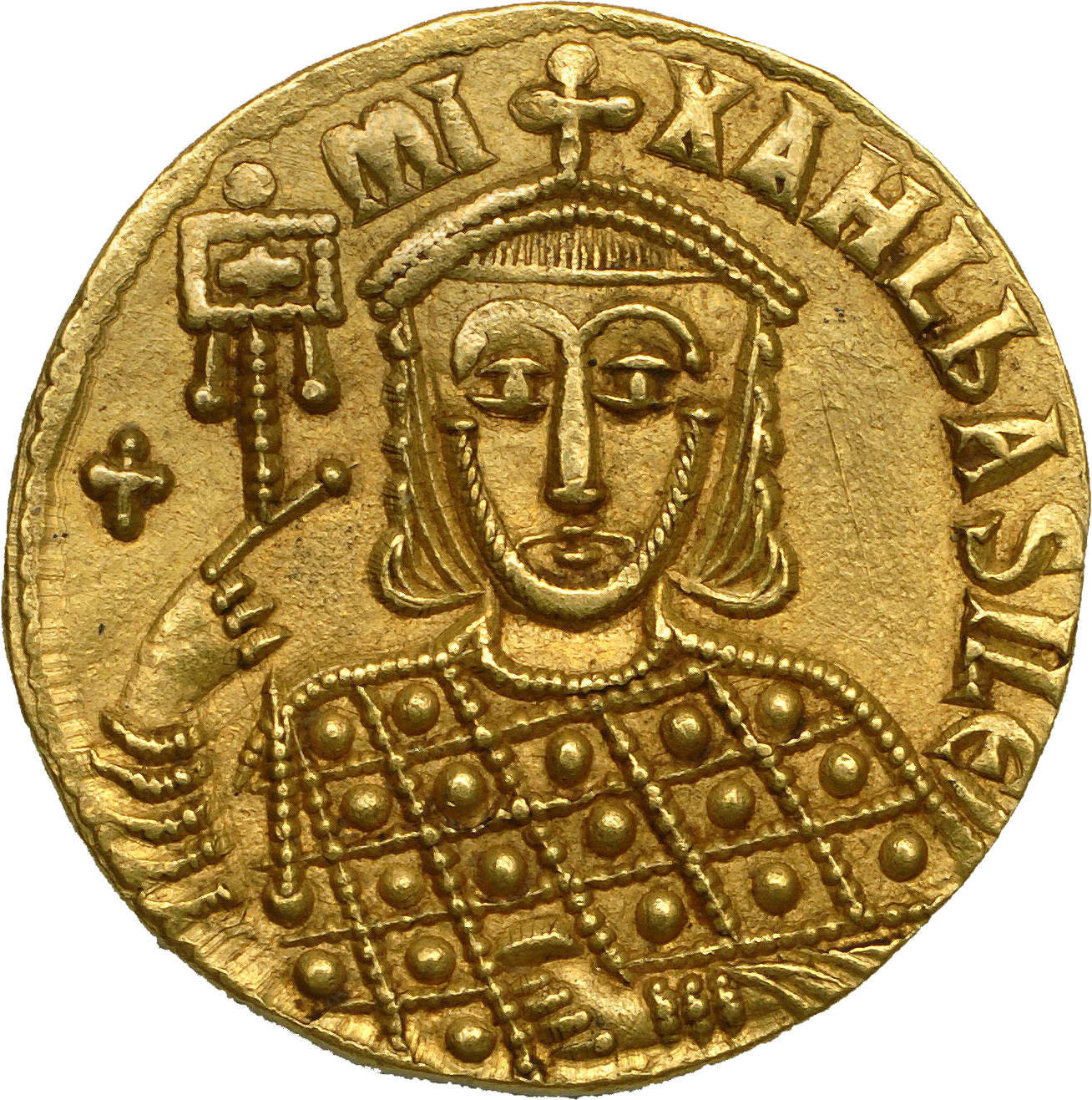
Solidus of Michael III as senior emperor, dating from 856 – 867

Michael III turned fifteen in 855, bringing him near the age when he could rule in his own right. According to the tradition of Simeon Logothete, he took Eudokia Ingerina as a mistress, and later married her to his co-emperor Basil I, though this narrative is challenged. Simeon's neutrality is disputed, and other contemporary sources do not speak of this conspiracy, leading several prominent Byzantists, such as Ostrogorsky and Adontz to dismiss this narrative. Whatever the case, although Theodora's rule had been highly successful, both she and Theoktistos were dissatisfied with Michael III, who neglected matters of state in preference of chariot racing, drinking and spending time with his alleged mistress Eudokia Ingerina. In the hope that marriage could perhaps steer him on the right course, Theodora organized a bride-show for her son. Though Eudokia Ingerina was allowed to be present, Theodora and Theoktistos disqualified her on account of not being a virgin. Michael was then married to Eudokia Dekapolitissa, against his will.

Annoyed by not being able to choose his own wife, Michael resolved to overthrow his mother and the regents. Michael was also concerned about unfounded rumors that Theodora planned to remarry, perhaps to Theoktistos, or marry one of Michael's sisters off to some suitable noble. These rumors, started by Bardas, further detailed that Theodora planned to retain power, elevate someone else to the throne and blind and depose Michael, following in Irene's footsteps. After years in exile, Bardas was summoned back to the capital by Michael and together they had Theoktistos assassinated in November 855. The conspiracy, which was also supported by Kalomaria (one of Theodora's sisters) and Theophanes (the chief of the wardrobe), may not originally have been intended to kill Theoktistos, and instead just to humiliate him and force him into exile. At a critical moment, however, Michael cried out to his guards to kill Theoktistos. According to the later writings of Joseph Genesius, Theodora learned of what was happening and rushed to save Theoktistos, but was scared away by one of the conspirators. Distraught at the loss of her friend and confidant, Theodora was enraged at Michael and the other conspirators for several months. She is recorded to have berated him for killing the man who had "acted as a second father to him". Unable to placate his mother, Michael proclaimed himself sole emperor on 15 March 856, formally deposing her as empress and stripping her of the rank of Augusta. The final catalyst for Theodora's deposition may have been her possibly being a part of a plot to assassinate Bardas. It is also possible that some senators wished to restore her to power, but Theodora refused. Theodora accepted the deposition, refraining from causing any of the damage that would result from a struggle for power, and retired in peace.

== Later life and legacy ==
Saint Theodora, Empress of the Romans
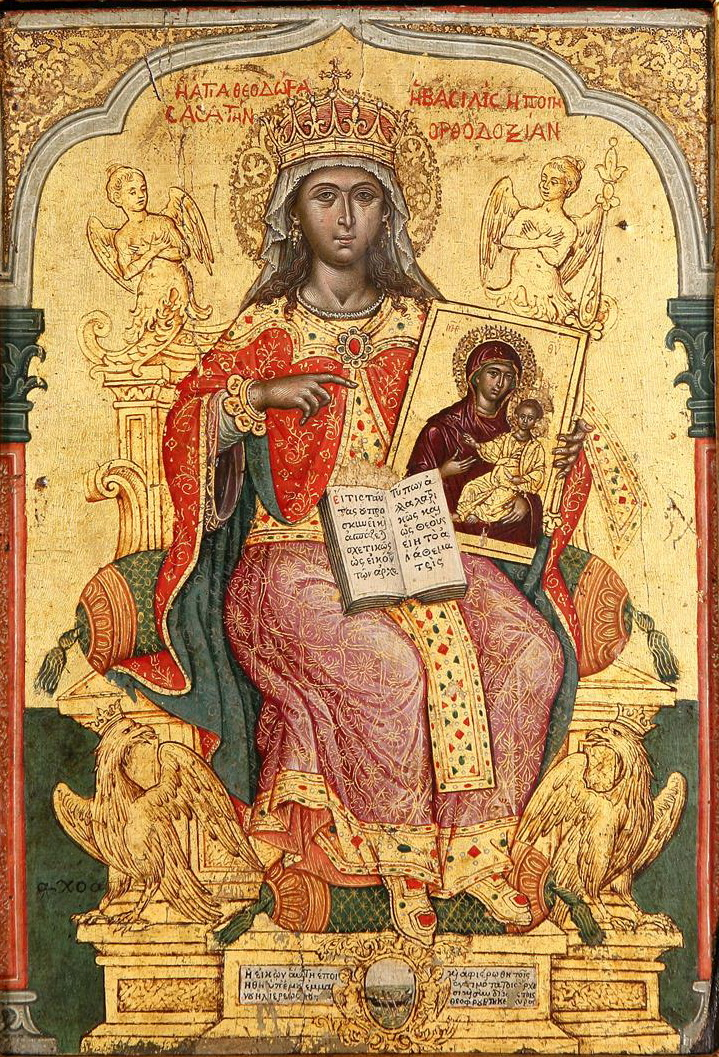
- Icon depicting Theodora by Emmanuel Tzanes (1671)

Holy Empress, Restorer of Orthodoxy
- Venerated in: Eastern Orthodoxy
- Major shrine: Metropolitan Cathedral of Panagia Spilaiotissa, Corfu
- Feast: 11 February
- Attributes: Imperial Vestment

Theodora continued to live in the imperial palace until 857 or 858, when she and Michael's sisters were expelled and confined to a convent in Gastria, despite Patriarch Ignatios refusing to tonsure them since they were not becoming nuns willingly. Later sources record that while in exile, Theodora took pity on a number of men who came to her for protection for various reasons and helped them. It is possible that she was released around 863 and was allowed by Michael to play a ceremonial role. Perhaps she was restored as Augusta. Theodora continued to resent Bardas, who reached high offices under Michael. Around 866, she sent him a tunic that was intentionally too short for him and had a golden partridge on it, interpreted by Bardas as a sign of deceit.

Towards the end of both of their lives, Theodora and Michael reconciled. In the autumn of 867, Theodora invited Michael to a dinner on 25 September and both seemed to be taking measures to ensure that it would be an agreeable occasion. Their dinner never took place since Michael was murdered by his friend and co-emperor Basil I after a dinner on the day before. Theodora had long mistrusted Basil but had been powerless to act against him. She died c. 867, at some point after Michael's murder. The last time she is attested was at Michael's burial, when she and her daughters are recorded as having been present and weeping over his body. She was buried in the convent in Gastria. Her remains are now housed in the Metropolitan Cathedral of Corfu, specifically in the Panagia Spilaiotissa Church. Her body was brought to Corfu from Constantinople in the 1480s, following the city's fall.

Theodora was highly regarded by later generations and she was remembered as a formidable leader, both because of her bringing an end to Iconoclasm and her successful dealings with foreign powers. Theodora is recognized as a saint in the Eastern Orthodox Church, commemorated on 11 February for her role in the restoration of the icons. Lynda Garland assessed Theodora as "a woman of character, who was able to exclude her brother from power without difficulty, who was not afraid to speak her mind when necessary, and who was fully capable of governing the empire".

In 2022, the Episcopal Church officially added Theodora to its liturgical calendar after four years of preliminary trial use.

== Notes ==
Theodora (wife of Theophilos) Amorian dynasty Born: c. 815 c. 867
Royal titles
Preceded by Euphrosyne	Byzantine empress consort 830–842	Succeeded by Eudokia Dekapolitissa
