= Thekla (daughter of Theophilos) =

Byzantine co-empress from 842 to c. 856

- Augusta; Empress of the Romans
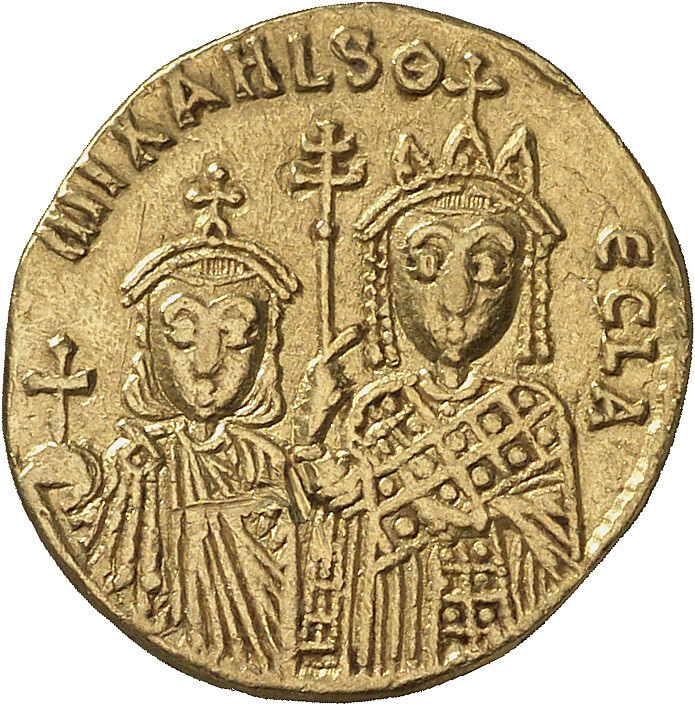
- Thekla (right) with her brother Michael III on the reverse of a solidus minted during the rule of her mother, Theodora

Byzantine co-empress
- Reign: 842–856
- Predecessor: Theophilos
- Successor: Michael III (as sole emperor)
- Regent: Theodora
- Born: Early 820s or 830s
- Died: After 870
- Burial: Monastery of Gastria
- Dynasty: Amorian dynasty
- Father: Theophilos
- Mother: Theodora
- Religion: Chalcedonian Christianity

Thekla (Greek: Θέκλα; early 820s or 830s – after 870), Latinized as Thecla, was a princess of the Amorian dynasty of the Byzantine Empire. The eldest child of Byzantine emperor Theophilos and empress Theodora, she was proclaimed augusta in the late 830s. After Theophilos's death in 842 and her mother becoming regent for Thekla's younger brother, Michael III, Thekla was associated with the regime as co-empress alongside Theodora and Michael and became the second reigning empress of the Empire after Irene of Athens, ruling alongside her brother.

Thekla was deposed by Michael III, possibly alongside her mother, in 856 and consigned to a convent in Constantinople. Some time later, she allegedly returned to imperial affairs and became the mistress of Michael's friend and co-emperor Basil I. After Basil murdered Michael in 867 and took power as the sole emperor, Thekla was neglected as his mistress and she took another lover, John Neatokometes. Once Basil found out about the affair, Thekla fell out of favor, was beaten, and had her property confiscated.

== Life ==
Thekla was born on an uncertain date, as calculating her date of birth depends on the year her parents married, estimated to be either c. 820/821, or 830. Thus she was born in either the early 820s or the early 830s. The historian Warren Treadgold gives her a birth date of c. 831, and the historian Juan Signes Codoñer of Spring 822. She is presented by contemporary sources as the eldest child of Byzantine emperor Theophilos and empress Theodora; but, some historians, such as John Bagnell Bury and Ernest Walter Brooks, have argued that her sister Maria was the eldest on the basis that she is the only one of the daughters to have been engaged, and generally the eldest married first. She was named after Theophilos's mother, Thekla. Thekla had six siblings: the four sisters Anna, Anastasia, Pulcheria, and Maria, whom Theophilos took great pride in, and the two brothers Constantine and Michael. Constantine, who shortly after birth had been proclaimed co-emperor by their father, drowned in a palace cistern as an infant.

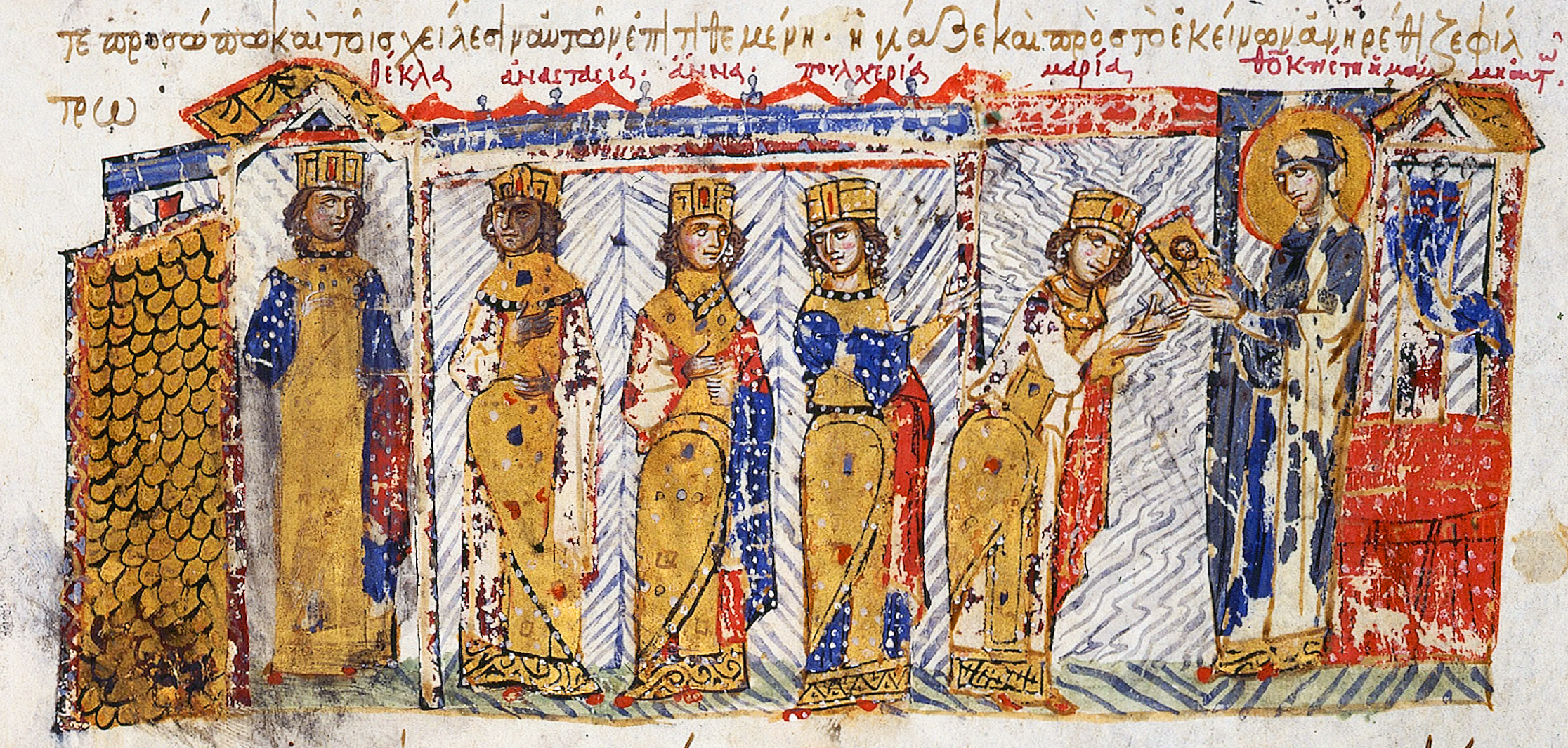
The daughters of Theophilos and Theodora being instructed in the veneration of icons by their grandmother Theoktiste, (Note: The reason for depicting Theodora's mother Theoktiste instead of Theophilos's step-mother Euphrosyne, who actually instructed the children in the veneration of icons, is unknown.) from the Madrid Skylitzes. Thekla is the first figure from the left.

In the 830s, the eldest sisters Thekla, Anna, and Anastasia were all proclaimed augustae, an honorific title sometimes granted to women of the imperial family. This event was commemorated through the issue of an unusual set of coins that depicted Theophilos, Theodora, and Thekla on one side and Anna and Anastasia on the other. Although Theophilos was a staunch iconoclast, and thus opposed the veneration of icons, (Note: Iconoclasm was a religious movement that held that icons, the depictions of holy figures, should not be created or venerated. In 726, Byzantine Emperor Leo III publicly embraced Iconoclasm, which continued until 787, when Emperor Constantine VI and Empress-regnant Irene repudiated it in the Second Council of Nicaea. Iconoclasm was revived by Emperor Leo V in 815 and continued by Michael II and Theophilos. Although Theophilos banned the creation of icons and oppressed Iconophiles, his work was later undone by Theodora in 843, after his death, and she is credited with the Triumph of Orthodoxy; Iconoclasm was anathematized in the 860s and 870s, and ceased to be a significant issue.) Thekla was taught to venerate them in secret by her mother and Theophilos's step-mother Euphrosyne. Theophilos built a palace for Thekla and her sisters at ta Karianou. Shortly before his death, Theophilos worked to betroth Thekla to Louis II, the heir to the Carolingian Empire, to unite the two empires against the threat they faced from continued Arab invasions. Such a match would also have been advantageous for Louis II's father Lothair I, who was engaged in a civil war against his brothers. Because of Lothair's defeat at the Battle of Fontenoy in 841 and Theophilos's death in 842, the marriage never happened.

After Theophilos's death on 20 January 842, Empress Theodora became regent for Thekla's young brother, the three-year-old Michael III. Coins issued in the first year of Theodora's rule depict Theodora alone on the obverse and Michael III together with Thekla on the reverse. The only one of the three given a title is Theodora (as Theodora despoina, "the Lady Theodora"). As co-empress, Thekla was associated with the regime alongside Theodora and Michael; this reality is indicated by her depiction on coins, where she is shown as larger than Michael. An imperial seal, also from Theodora's early rule, titles not only Michael but also Theodora and Thekla as "Emperors of the Romans". The fact that Thekla is on the coinage implies that she also had some claim to the throne or that Michael's position as successor was uncertain. Thekla's inclusion indicates that she was groomed, in case Michael died before reaching adulthood, as a potential transmitter of imperial lineage and authority. The elevation of Thekla to the throne was the work of Empress Theodora and the logothete Theoktistos, as they were the actual rulers of the empire after Theophilos' death. That Thekla shared the purple could be explained by Theodora's concern to ensure the survival of the dynasty which now depended on two-year-old Michael. The numismatist Philip Grierson comments that dated documents from the time of the coins' minting prove that she was "formally associated with Theodora and Michael in the government of the Empire." However, the historian George Ostrogorsky states that Thekla does not appear to have been interested in government affairs. Thekla fell seriously ill in 843, and is said to have been cured by visiting the Theotokos monastery in Constantinople; for curing Thekla, Theodora issued a chrysobull to the monastery. An undated inscription on the city walls of Selymbria speaks of the restoration of that city during the reigns of Michael, Theodora and Thekla, confirming that Thekla was officially considered co-ruler with her brother. The Acta of the 42 Martyrs of Amorium link Thekla as co-ruler with Michael and Theodora. It said that the martyrs died on 6 March 845, when the Roman state was ruled by Michael, Theodora and Thekla, the Christian and Orthodox great basileōn ("emperors"). This is the only dated source mentioning Thekla as co-empress. Thekla was associated with the purple, but, when Michael became sole ruler, he suppressed the coins on which Thekla was portrayed.

On 15 March 856, Theodora's rule officially ended with Michael III being proclaimed sole emperor. In 857 or 858 Theodora was expelled from the imperial palace and confined to a convent in Gastria, in Constantinople; the monastery had been converted from a house by her maternal grandmother, Theoktiste, likely during the reign of Theophilos. Thekla and the other sisters were either expelled and placed in the same convent at the same time, or had already been there for some time. Whether they were ordained as nuns is uncertain: they may have actually been ordained, or it may only have been intended. In one version of the narrative, they were confined to the palace at ta Karianou in November 858, possibly in a semi-monastical setting. Another version claims they were immediately placed in the Monastery of Gastria. The most common narrative states that Theodora was confined to the monastery with Pulcheria, while Thekla, and her other sisters Anna and Anastasia, were first kept at the palace at ta Karianou, but shortly thereafter moved to the Monastery of Gastria and shorn as nuns. Theodora may have been released from the convent around 863. According to the tradition of Symeon Logothete, a 10th-century Byzantine historian, Thekla was also released and used by Michael III to attempt to make a political deal. He states that in around 865, Michael had married his long-time lover Eudokia Ingerina to his friend and co-emperor Basil I, in order to mask the continued relationship of Michael and Eudokia. Some historians, such as Cyril Mango, believe that Michael did so after impregnating Eudokia, to ensure that the child would be born legitimate. However, Symeon's neutrality is disputed, and other contemporary sources do not speak of this conspiracy, leading several prominent Byzantists, such as Ostrogorsky and Nicholas Adontz to dismiss this narrative.

According to Symeon, Michael also offered Thekla to Basil as a mistress, perhaps to keep his attention away from Eudokia, a plan which Thekla had allegedly consented to. Thus Thekla, who Treadgold states was 35 at the time, became Basil's mistress in early 866, according to Symeon's narrative. The historian William Greenwalt speculates on the reasons that drove Thekla to agree to this relationship: resentment for having been unmarried for so long, Basil's imposing physical stature, or political gain. After Basil murdered Michael III in 867 and seized power for himself, Symeon further writes that Thekla then became neglected and took another lover, John Neatokometes, sometime after 870. When Basil found out about the affair, he had John beaten and consigned to a monastery. Thekla was also beaten and her considerable riches were confiscated. Mango, who supports the theory of the alleged affairs, commented that Basil would already have had good reason to dislike Neatokometes, as the man had attempted to warn Michael of his impending murder, but believes the best explanation for Basil's response is that "Thekla had previously occupied some place in his life", as a mistress. The De Ceremoniis, a 10th-century Byzantine book on courtly protocol and history, states that she was buried in the Monastery of Gastria, where she had been confined earlier, in a sarcophagus with her mother and her sisters Anastasia and Pulcheria.

== Bibliography ==
- Codoñer, Juan Signes (2016) [2014]. The Emperor Theophilos and the East, 829–842: Court and Frontier in Byzantium during the Last Phase of Iconoclasm. Oxford: Routledge. ISBN 978-0-7546-6489-5.
- Garland, Lynda (1999). Byzantine Empresses: Women and Power in Byzantium AD 527–1204. London: Routledge. ISBN 0-415-14688-7.
- Greenwalt, William S. (2002). "Thecla". In Commire, Anne (ed.). Women in World History: A Biographical Encyclopedia. Vol. 15: Sul–Vica. Waterford: Yorkin Publications. ISBN 0-7876-4074-3.
- Grierson, Philip (1973). Catalogue of the Byzantine Coins in the Dumbarton Oaks Collection and in the Whittemore Collection, 3: Leo III to Nicephorus III, 717–1081. Washington, D.C.: Dumbarton Oaks Research Library and Collection. ISBN 978-0-88402-045-5.
- Herrin, Judith (2002) [2001]. Women in Purple: Rulers of Medieval Byzantium. London: Phoenix Press. ISBN 1-84212-529-X.
- Herrin, Judith (2013). Unrivalled Influence: Women and Empire in Byzantium. Oxford: Princeton University Press. ISBN 978-0-691-15321-6.
- Kazhdan, Alexander, ed. (1991). Oxford Dictionary of Byzantium. Oxford: Oxford University Press. ISBN 978-0-19-504652-6.
- Lilie, Ralph-Johannes; Ludwig, Claudia; Pratsch, Thomas; Zielke, Beate (1998–2013). Prosopographie der mittelbyzantinischen Zeit (in German). Berlin and Boston: De Gruyter.
- Mango, Cyril (1973). "Eudocia Ingerina, the Normans, and the Macedonian Dynasty". Zbornika Radova Vizantoloskog Instituta. 14–15. ISSN 0584-9888.
- Ostrogorsky, George (1956). History of the Byzantine State. New Brunswick: Rutgers University Press. ISBN 978-0-813-51198-6.
- Treadgold, Warren (1975). "The Problem of the Marriage of the Emperor Theophilus". Greek, Roman, and Byzantine Studies. 16: 325–341. ISSN 2159-3159.
- Treadgold, Warren (1997). A History of the Byzantine State and Society. Stanford: Stanford University Press. ISBN 978-0-8047-2630-6.
- Skylitzes, John; Wortley, John (7 October 2010). "Michael III, the son of Theophilos [842–867], and his mother Theodora [842–862]". John Skylitzes: A Synopsis of Byzantine History, 811–1057: Translation and Notes. Translated by Wortley, John. Cambridge University Press. pp. 82–115. ISBN 978-1-139-48915-7.
- Wasilewski, Tadeusz [in Polish] (1970). "Studia nad dziejami panowania cesarza Michała III (842-867) : cz. II: przewrót państwowy w 851/852 r. i ofensywa w Azji Mniejszej przeciwko Arabom" (PDF). Przegląd Historyczny. 61 (3): 359–380.
- Ostrogorsky, George (1953). "Тактикон Успенског и Тактикон Бенешевића: О времену њиховог постанка". Зборник радова Византолошког института (in Serbian). 2: 39–59.
