= Metropolis of Corfu, Paxoi and the Diapontian Islands =

Location
- Country: Greece
- Metropolitan: Nektarios (Dovas)

Statistics
- Churches: 180+

Information
- Denomination: Eastern Orthodox
- Established: 11th century AD
- Cathedral: Metropolitan Cathedral of Panagia Spilaiotissa
- Patron saint: St. Spyridon the Wonderworker
- Language: Greek

Website
- https://imcorfu.gr

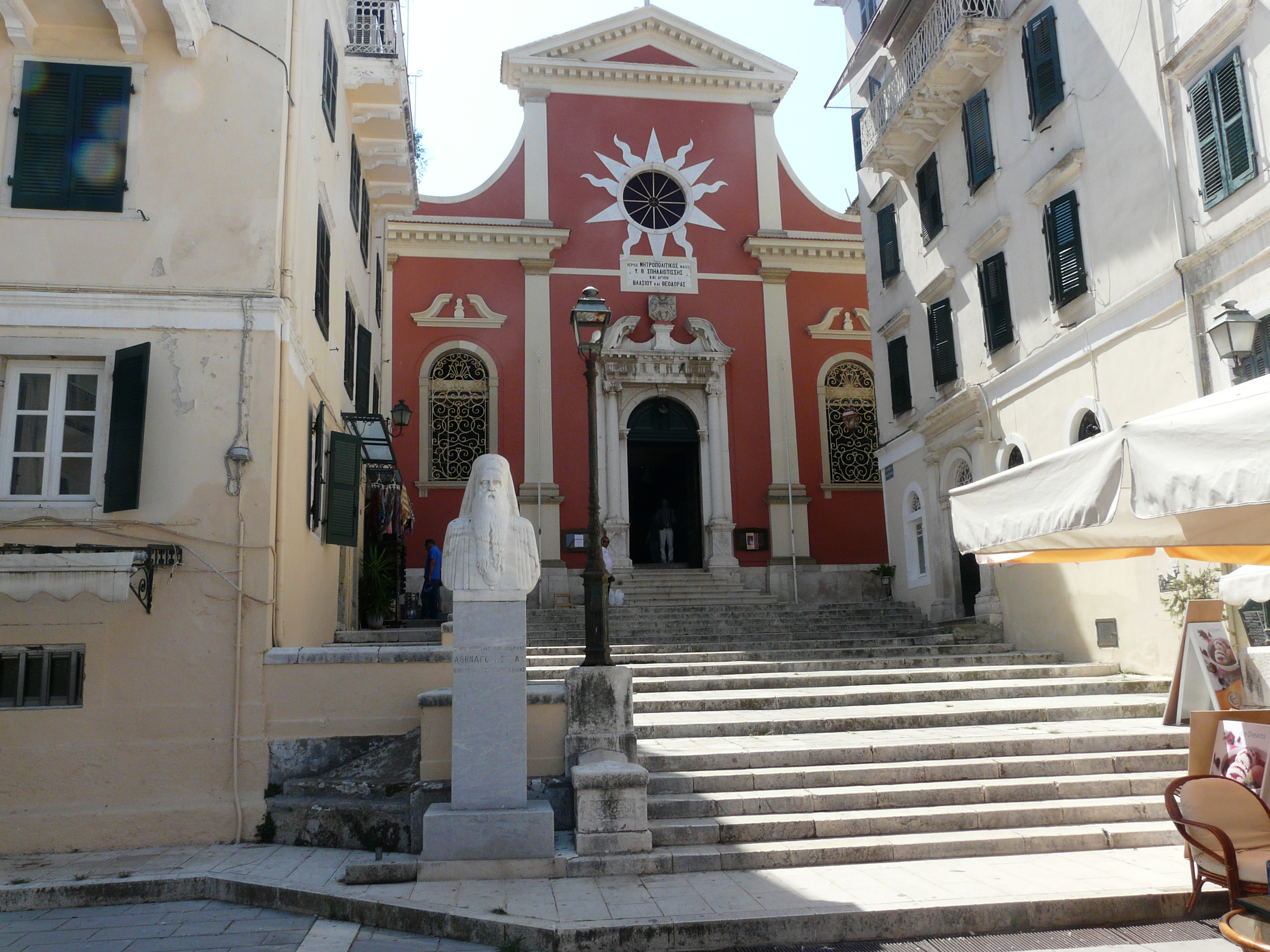
The Metropolitan Cathedral of the Theotokos Spilaiotissa in Corfu town

The Metropolis of Corfu, Paxoi and the Diapontian Islands (Greek: Ιερά Μητρόπολις Κερκύρας, Παξών και Διαποντίων Νήσων) is a metropolitan see of the Church of Greece. Its seat is the town of Corfu on the island of Corfu in northwestern Greece. It encompasses the entire Corfu Prefecture, i.e. not only the island of Corfu, but also the two small island groups of Paxoi and the Diapontian Islands.

== History ==
The foundation of the see of Corfu exists is attributed to the establishment of a shrine to Saint Stephen there by two disciples of Saint Paul, Jason of Tarsus and Sosipatrus of Achaea. Its bishops are attested as participating in ecumenical councils from 325 to 787, originally as suffragans of Nicopolis and later of Cephallenia. As with the other sees of the Illyricum, it was transferred from the See of Rome to the overall jurisdiction of the Patriarchate of Constantinople in the 8th century. It was raised to the status of an archbishopric in the second half of the 10th century, and finally became a metropolitan see sometime in the third quarter of the 11th century. Following the conquest of the island by Western powers (the Genoese, Venetians, and Angevins) from the turn of the 13th century, a Roman Catholic archbishopric was established on the island, first attested in 1228. Under Catholic rule, the local Orthodox Christian population was served by a head priest (protopapas). The Orthodox bishopric was not restored until 1800, after the fall of the Republic of Venice and the establishment of the Septinsular Republic.

== Sources ==
- Kazhdan, Alexander, ed. (1991). The Oxford Dictionary of Byzantium. Oxford and New York: Oxford University Press. ISBN 0-19-504652-8.
- Nesbitt, John; Oikonomides, Nicolas, eds. (1994). Catalogue of Byzantine Seals at Dumbarton Oaks and in the Fogg Museum of Art, Volume 2: South of the Balkans, the Islands, South of Asia Minor. Vol. 2. Washington, DC: Dumbarton Oaks Research Library and Collection. ISBN 0-88402-226-9.
