= Protopapas =

Greek Orthodox ecclesiastical office

Protopapas (Greek: πρωτοπαπᾶς or πρωτόπαπας, "first priest, archpriest") is a Greek Orthodox ecclesiastical office.

The office appeared in Byzantine times, when the protopapas was a subaltern of a bishop, along with his own deputy, the deutereuon ("the second one"). Already in the middle Byzantine period (8th–12th centuries), protopapades were appointed as the head clerics of particularly important churches, or as a bishop's representatives in the rural districts. The mid-14th century Book of Offices of Pseudo-Kodinos mentions the role of the protopapas of the imperial palace during imperial church ceremonies on Christmas and Epiphany, as well as during the Holy Week. According to Pseudo-Kodinos, the protopapas of the emperor and the protopapas of the Great Church (i.e., of the Ecumenical Patriarch of Constantinople) were distinct, but could sometimes be held in tandem by the same person. In the late 14th century, the head of the "imperial clerics" was the protopapas of the Blachernae Church (located in the main imperial residence, the Palace of Blachernae), while another protopapas was responsible for the coronation and funerary Church of the Holy Apostles, where the early Byzantine emperors were buried.

In the Greek lands under Latin rule, including in southern Italy following the Norman conquest, Orthodox bishops of the Greek Rite were often displaced by Roman Catholic bishops of the Latin Rite. As Church canons forbade the simultaneous presence of two bishops in the same see, in these areas, a protopapas (in Latin also archipresbyter Graecorum) served as the head of the Greek Orthodox clergy.

This system survived longest in the Ionian Islands, which were a Venetian possession until 1797. In Corfu, where the local Orthodox bishopric had been abolished already by the Angevins in the late 13th century, the Orthodox nobility and ecclesiastical canons chose the megas protopapas ("grand archpriest"), since there were junior protopapades in the districts of the island. As he lacked the bishop's power to consecrate priests, all candidates had to go to Cephalonia, where the Orthodox bishopric continued in existence, to be ordained. To secure its control over the office, from 1578 the Venetian government removed the megas protopapas of Corfu from the jurisdiction of both the local Latin Archbishop as well as the Ecumenical Patriarch of Constantinople. The smaller islands of Ithaca and Zakynthos each had a protopapas of their own, subject to the Bishop of Cephalonia.

== Sources ==
- Kraus, Christof Rudolf (2007). Kleriker im späten Byzanz: Anagnosten, Hypodiakone, Diakone und Priester 1261-1453. Otto Harrassowitz Verlag. ISBN 978-3-447-05602-1.
- Richard, Jean (1989). "The establishment of the Latin Church in the empire of Constantinople (1204–1227)". In Arbel, Benjamin; Hamilton, Bernard F.; Jacoby, David (eds.). Latins and Greeks in the Eastern Mediterranean after 1204. London: Frank Cass and Company Ltd. pp. 45–62. ISBN 0-7146-3372-0.
- Skoufari, Evangelia (2014). "Aspects of Religious Coexistence: The Historiography of the Orthodox and Catholic Churches in the Ionian Islands During the Period of Venetian Domination". In Hirst, Anthony; Sammon, Patrick (eds.). The Ionian Islands: Aspects of their History and Culture. Cambridge Scholars Publishing. pp. 264–275. ISBN 978-1-4438-6278-3.
- Verpeaux, Jean, ed. (1966). Pseudo-Kodinos, Traité des Offices (in French). Paris: Centre National de la Recherche Scientifique.
