= Prosopography of the Byzantine World =

The Prosopography of the Byzantine World (PBW) is a project to create a prosopographical database of individuals named in textual sources in the Byzantine Empire and surrounding areas in the period from 642 to 1265. The project is a collaboration between the British Academy and the Berlin-Brandenburg Academy of Sciences and Humanities.

== Origins ==
The project was begun in the 1980s with the aim of completing the work on later Roman Empire and Byzantine prosopography begun by Theodore Mommsen in the 19th century and carried on by A.H.M. Jones and J. R. Martindale, which produced The Prosopography of the Later Roman Empire (three volumes, Cambridge, 1971–1992), covering the period from 260 (the accession of Gallienus) to 641 (the death of Heraclius, marking the end of late Antiquity).

In 1993, the British Academy signed a collaboration agreement with the Berlin-Brandenburg Academy. The work is divided into three periods, 641–867 (Heraclian dynasty to the Amorian dynasty), 867–1025 (Macedonian dynasty up to the death of Basil II) and 1025–1261 (last Macedonians, the Komnenian period, and up to the recovery of Constantinople from the Latin Empire). The Palaiologan period, after 1261, is covered by the Prosopographisches Lexikon der Palaiologenzeit, launched by the Austrian Academy of Sciences under the direction of Erich Trapp and published between 1976 and 1991.

== Status ==
The first result was the Prosopographie der mittelbyzantinischen Zeit, Abteilung I: 641–867, edited by Friedhelm Winkelmann and Ralph-Johannes Lilie and published in five volumes between 1998 and 2002. A version of this database is hosted at Berlin-Brandenburg Academy. In 2001, the British Academy published a CD-ROM with its own Prosopography of the Byzantine Empire I (641–867), edited by John Robert Martindale, which is complementary to the German work. A section of the database covering the period 1025–1261 is hosted at King's College London and is freely accessible from the internet.

The project aimed to cover all named individuals in the Byzantine world in the period from 641, where The Prosopography of the Later Roman Empire ends, to 1265. The geographical scope has since been extended to cover Jerusalem. As of 2006 the PBW itself covers the period 1025 to 1180, a total of some 10,000 individuals. The data is drawn from textual sources and also from sigillography which constitutes an important resource in Byzantine prosopography. Around 7500 seals are recorded. The project team estimate that, in printed form, the database would amount to some 1400 pages.

The project was chaired until 2005 by Dame Averil Cameron. The current chair is Professor Charlotte Roueché FSA, head of the Byzantine and Modern Greek Studies department at King's College London. The project has been funded by the Arts and Humanities Research Council.

== Selected publications ==
- John Robert Martindale, ed., Prosopography of the Byzantine Empire, Vol. 1 (Ashgate compact disc, 2001)

== See also ==
- Prosopography of Anglo-Saxon England
