= Metropolitan Cathedral of Panagia Spilaiotissa =

- Μητροπολιτικός Ναός Παναγίας Σπηλαιώτισσας
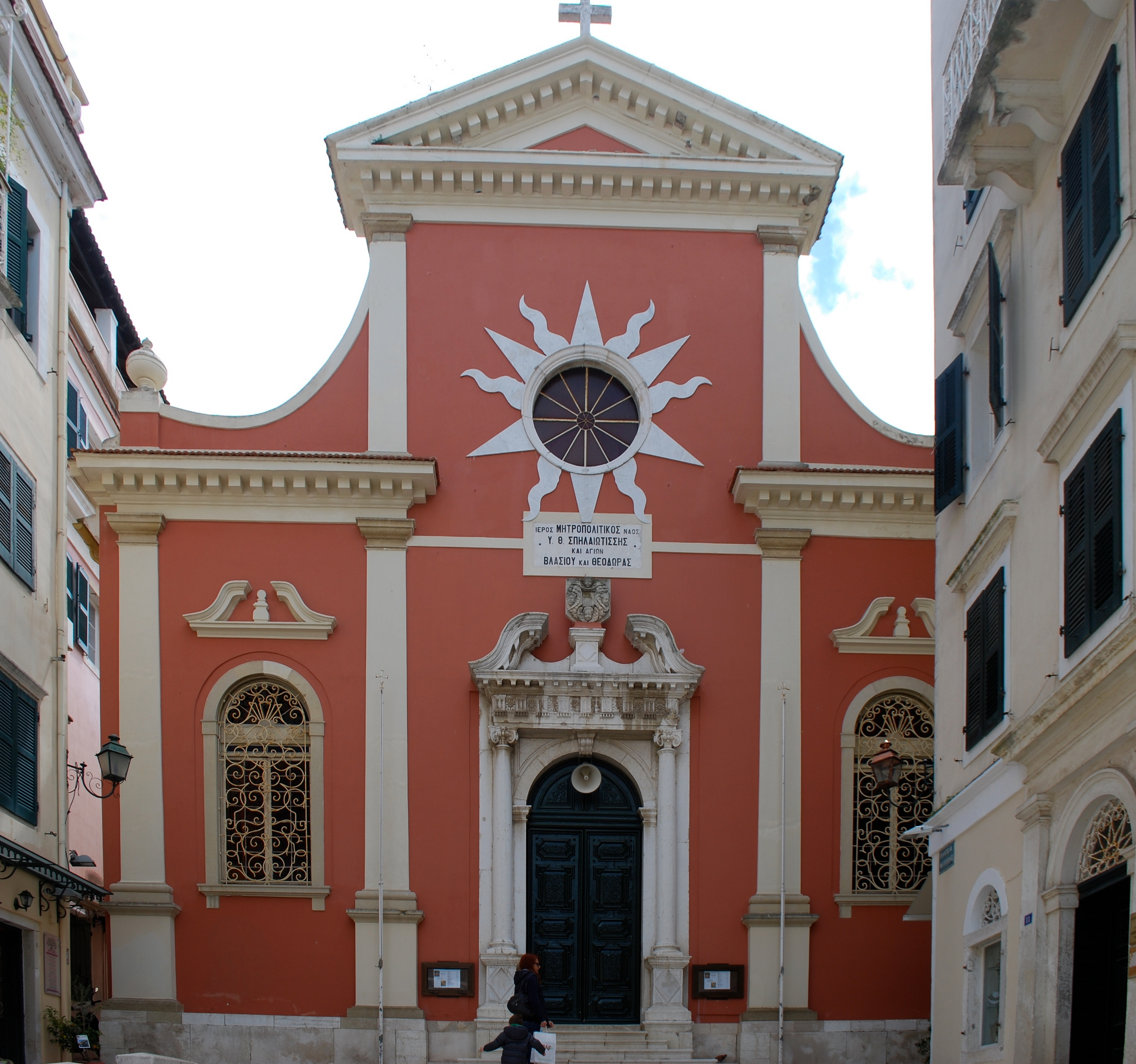

- 39°37′33″N 19°55′17″E
- Location: Corfu City, Corfu
- Country: Greece
- Language: Greek
- Denomination: Greek Orthodox

History
- Status: Open
- Dedication: Panagia Spilaiotissa, Saint Vlasios and Saint Theodora
- Dedicated: February 11; August 15

Architecture
- Completed: 1577

Administration
- Metropolis: Metropolis of Corfu, Paxoi and the Diapontian Islands

The Metropolitan Cathedral of Panagia Spilaiotissa (Greek: Μητροπολιτικός Ναός Παναγίας Σπηλαιώτισσας) or Holy Metropolitan Church of Corfu is the cathedral of the Metropolis of Corfu, Paxoi and the Diapontian Islands. It is located in the center of the city of Corfu, Greece. It was consecrated in honor of Panagia Spilaiotissa, Saint Vlasios Sevastias and Saint Theodora. The cathedral celebrates on February 11 and August 15.

The church was built in 1577 on the ruins of an ancient church, and was dedicated to Saint Vlasios. In the 18th century, the cathedral was rebuilt in the Baroque style. In 1841, the church became the cathedral of the Holy Metropolis.

The two main holy objects located inside the church are the icon of Panagia Spilaiotissa and the relics of Saint Theodora, which were transferred from Constantinople to Corfu in 1460.
